= List of opera festivals =

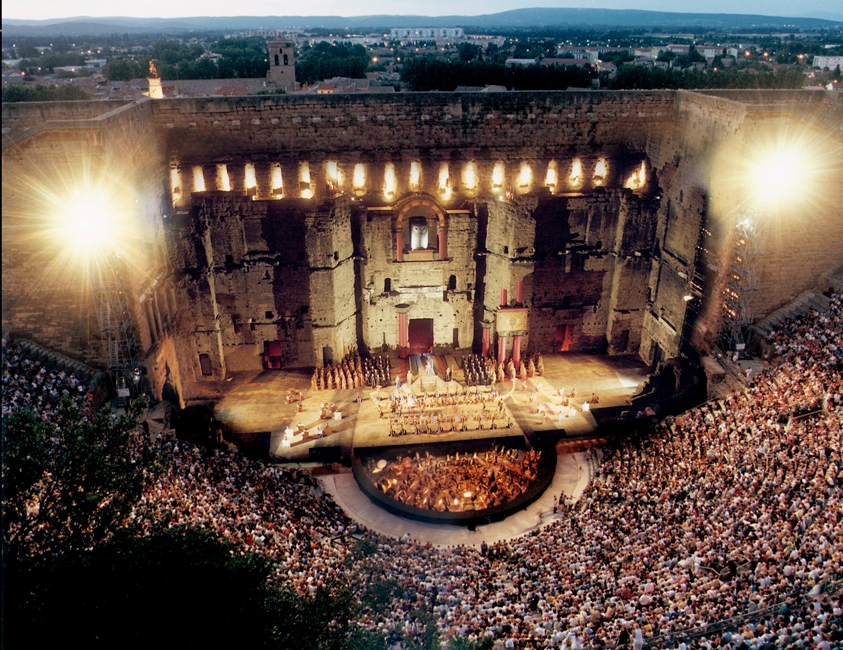
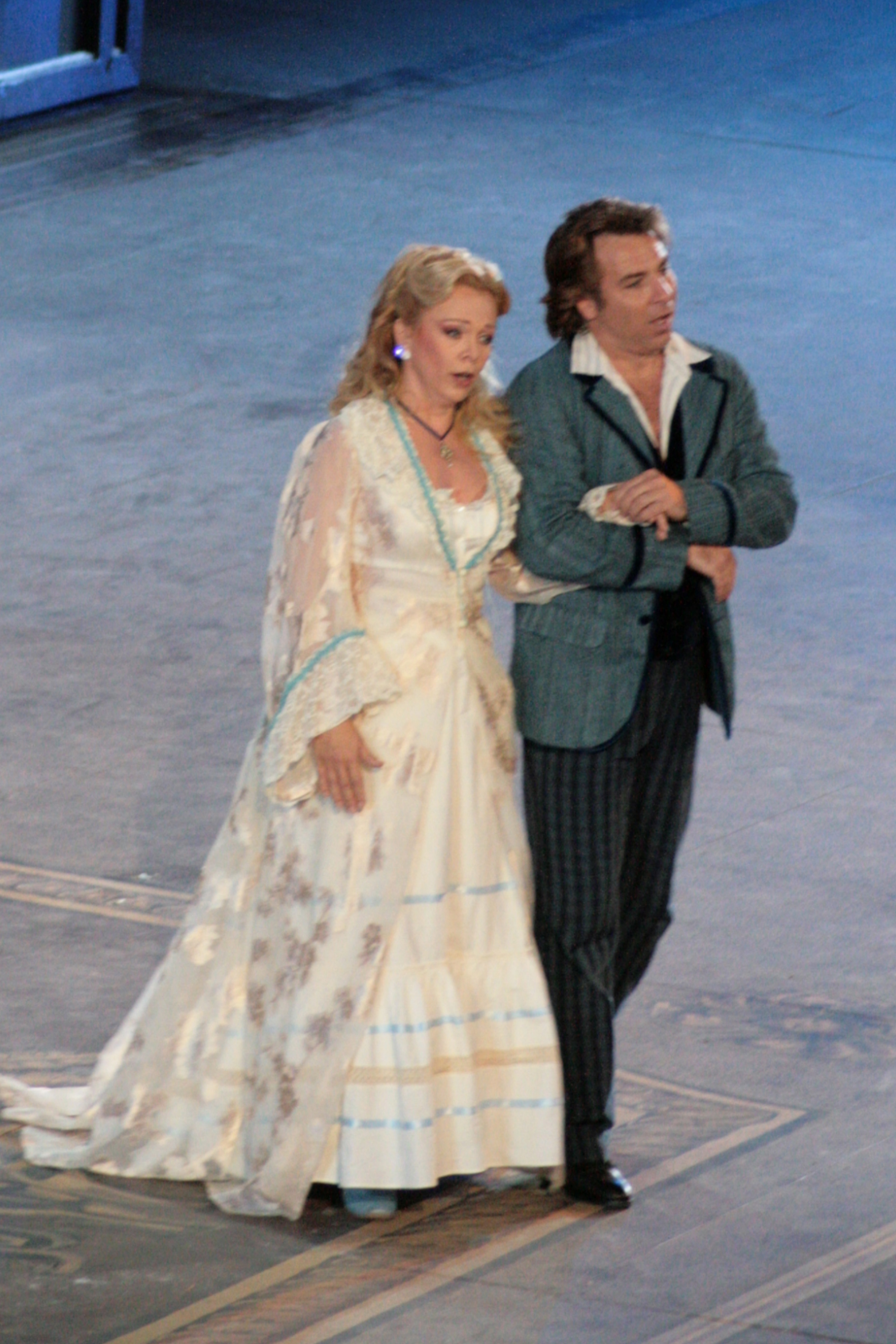

General Information
- Related genres: Opera, classical music, early music
- Location: Worldwide
- Related events: Category:Music festivals, Category:Opera festivals, early music festivals

This is an inclusive list of opera festivals and summer opera seasons, and music festivals which have opera productions. This list may have some overlap with list of early music festivals.

Opera is part of the Western classical music tradition, and has long been performed for audiences on a large-scale format. It started in Italy at the end of the 16th century and soon spread through the rest of Europe. In the 18th century, Italian opera continued to dominate most of Europe (except France), attracting foreign composers such as Handel. Opera seria was the most prestigious form of Italian opera, until Gluck reacted against its artificiality with his "reform" operas in the 1760s. Today, the most renowned figure of late-18th-century opera is Mozart, and his music is at times the featured attraction of opera and early music festivals.

== Related lists and categories ==
The following lists may have some overlap:

- List of music festivals
- List of early music festivals

The following categories are related:

- Category:Music festivals
- Category:Opera festivals
- Category:Choral festivals
- Category:Classical music festivals
- Category:Chamber music festivals
- Category:Contemporary classical music festivals
- Category:Early music festivals

== Opera festivals by name ==
Name	Theatre or location	Principal venue	Notes / known for
Arena di Verona Festival	Arena di Verona	Italy: Verona	Roman arena
Aspen Music Festival	Wheeler Opera House	United States: Aspen, Colorado	
Aspendos Opera and Ballet Festival	Aspendos Arena	Turkey: Aspendos	Organised by Turkish State Opera and Ballet Directorate
Atlantic Music Festival Opera Workshop	Strider Theater	United States: Waterville, Maine	
Amazonas Opera Festival	Amazon Theatre	Brazil: Manaus	Organised by Amazonas State Government
Bayreuth Festival	Bayreuth Festspielhaus	Germany: Bayreuth	Richard Wagner
Bergen International Festival	Grieghallen	Norway: Bergen	
Blackwater Valley Opera Festival	Lismore Castle	Ireland: Blackwater Valley	
Boston Early Music Festival		United States: Boston, Massachusetts	Early music
Bregenz Festival	Seebühne	Austria: Bregenz	large stage
Buxton Festival | Buxton Opera House	United Kingdom: Buxton		
Cantiere Internazionale d'Arte	Teatro Comunale Poliziano	Italy: Montepulciano	Workshops of opera, music, and theatre
Caramoor International Music Festival	Venetian Theatre	United States: Katonah, New York	
Castleton Festival	Festival Theatre	United States: Castleton, Virginia	
Central City Opera	Central City Opera House	United States: Central City, Colorado	
Chautauqua Opera	Norton Memorial Hall	United States: Chautauqua, New York	
Cincinnati Opera Summer Festival	Cincinnati Music Hall	United States: Cincinnati, Ohio	
Chorégies d'Orange	Théâtre Antique d'Orange	France: Orange	Roman theatre
Copenhagen Opera Festival	Copenhagen	Denmark: Copenhagen	Free Festival Stage
Dalhalla Opera	Dalhalla	Sweden: Rättvik	
Des Moines Metro Opera	Blank Performing Arts Center	United States: Indianola, Iowa	3 mainstage productions; 2nd Stages Series: 2 productions throughout Des Moines
DomStufen-Festspiele	Theater Erfurt	Germany: Erfurt, Thuringia	International Opera Festival in heart of Germany, summer: one mainstage production, one production for children
Dorset Opera Festival	The Coade Hall	United Kingdom: Blandford Forum, Dorset	Country house opera: large-scale works
Drottningholm	Drottningholm Palace Theatre	Sweden: Stockholm	Early works
Festspiel Baden-Baden	Festspielhaus Baden-Baden	Germany: Baden-Baden	
Festival d'Ambronay	Abbey of Ambronay	France: Ambronay	Baroque works
Festival de Ópera do Theatro da Paz	Theatro da Paz	Brazil: Belém	Organized by Pará state government
Festival de Radio France et Montpellier	Le Corum	France: Montpellier	Rare works
Festival dei Due Mondi	Teatro Caio Melisso	Italy: Spoleto	
Festival della Valle d'Itria	Palazzo Ducale	Italy: Martina Franca	Rare works
Festival d'Aix-en-Provence	Théâtre de l'Archevêché, Grand Théâtre de Provence, Théâtre du Jeu de Paume	France: Aix-en-Provence	
Festival d'Opéra Baroque de Beaune	Hospices de Beaune	France: Beaune	Baroque works
Festival Puccini	Teatro dei Quattromila	Italy: Torre del Lago	Giacomo Puccini, Large-stage
Festwochen der Alten Musik	Tiroler Landestheater	Austria: Innsbruck	Early works
Fort Worth Opera	Bass Performance Hall	United States: Fort Worth, Texas	
Garsington Opera	Wormsley Park	United Kingdom: Stokenchurch, Buckinghamshire	Country house opera
George Enescu Festival	Romanian Athenaeum	Romania: Bucharest	
Glimmerglass Festival	Alice Busch Opera Theater	United States: Cooperstown, New York	
Glyndebourne Festival Opera	Glyndebourne Opera House	United Kingdom: Glyndebourne	Country house opera
Grange Park Opera	West Horsley Place	United Kingdom: West Horsley, Surrey	Country house opera
Handa Opera on Sydney Harbour	Sydney Harbour	Australia: Sydney	
Iford Arts Festival	Iford Manor	United Kingdom: Bradford-on-Avon, Wiltshire	Country house opera
InterHarmony International Music Festival	Chiesa Santo Spirito, Rathaus	Germany: Sulzbach-Rosenberg	locations in 2 countries
InterHarmony International Music Festival	Chiesa Santo Spirito, Rathaus	Italy: Acqui Terme	locations in 2 countries
International Punta Classic Opera Festival	Punta del Este	Uruguay: Punta del Este	Giacomo Puccini
Kammeroper Schloss Rheinsberg	Schlosstheater	Germany: Rheinsberg	young singers
Läckö Castle Opera	Läckö Castle	Sweden: Lidköping	Inner courtyard of baroque castle
Lismore Opera Festival	Lismore Castle	Ireland: Lismore, County Waterford	
Lucerne Festival	Lucerne Culture and Congress Centre	Switzerland: Lucerne	
Longborough Festival Opera	Banks Fee House	United Kingdom: Longborough	Country house opera
Maggio Musicale Fiorentino	Teatro Communale and Teatro della Pergola	Italy: Florence	
Miskolc Opera Festival	Grand Theatre	Hungary: Miskolc	Bartok; other operas
Munich Biennale	Gasteig	Germany: Munich	New opera and music-theatre
Munich Opera Festival	Nationaltheater München	Germany: Munich	
Nevill Holt Opera	Nevill Holt Hall	United Kingdom: Nevill Holt, Leicestershire	Country house opera
Opera Barga Festival	Teatro dei Differenti	Italy: Barga	
Opéra de Baugé	Les Capucins	France: Baugé	Country house opera
Opera Holland Park	Holland Park Theatre	United Kingdom: London	
Opera Memphis	Playhouse on the Square	United States: Memphis, Tennessee	
Opera Saratoga	Spa Little Theater	United States: Saratoga Springs, New York	Formerly known as Lake George Opera
Opera Theatre of Lucca	Teatro del Giglio	Italy: Lucca	
Opera Theatre of Saint Louis	Loretto-Hilton Theater	United States: St. Louis, Missouri	
OperaFest Tulchyn	Tulchyn, Ukraine		
Operosa	Herceg Novi, Montenegro, Bulgaria, Belgrade, Serbia	Montenegro: Herceg Novi	
Opernfest	Kino Delphi (Berlin-Weißensee) former silent movie theatre	Germany: Berlin	
Pafos Aphrodite Festival Cyprus	Paphos Castle	Cyprus: Paphos	
Phoenicia International Festival of the Voice		United States: Phoenicia, New York	
Piccolo Opera Festival	Spessa Castle and various locations	Italy: Friuli-Venezia Giulia	No borders Opera experience in historical venues
Piccolo Opera Festival	Spessa Castle and various locations	Slovenia: Gorizia Hills	No borders Opera experience in historical venues
PromFest	Endla Theatre	Estonia: Pärnu	
Ravenna Festival	Teatro Communale Alighieri	Italy: Ravenna	
Ravinia Festival	Ravinia Park	United States: Highland Park, Illinois	
Rossini in Wildbad	Königliches Kurtheater, König-Karls-Bad	Germany: Bad Wildbad	Gioachino Rossini
Rossini Opera Festival	Teatro Rossini	Italy: Pesaro	Gioachino Rossini
Salzburg Easter Festival	Großes Festspielhaus	Austria: Salzburg	
Salzburg Summer Festival	Großes Festspielhaus, Felsenreitschule	Austria: Salzburg	
Salzburg Whitsun Festival	Großes Festspielhaus	Austria: Salzburg	
Mozart Week	Salzburg	Austria: Salzburg	
Santa Fe Opera	The Crosby Theatre	United States: Santa Fe, New Mexico	popular operas, rarely performed + North American / World premieres
Savonlinna Opera Festival	Olavinlinna Castle	Finland: Savonlinna	Mediaeval castle surrounded by a lake
Schwetzingen Festival	Schlosstheater Schwetzingen	Germany: Schwetzingen	
Sferisterio Opera Festival	Sferisterio di Macerata	Italy: Macerata	
Spoleto Festival USA	Gaillard Center, Sottile Theatre, Festival Hall	United States: Charleston, South Carolina	
Stars of the White Nights Festival	Mariinsky Theatre	Russia: Saint Petersburg	
Strasbourg Music Festival	various locations including Strasbourg Cathedral	France: Strasbourg	
Stålboga Summer Opera	Music pavilion at Stålboga manor house	Sweden: Södermanland	Country house opera
Tanglewood Music Festival	Tanglewood Music Center	United States: Lenox, Massachusetts	
Teatro dell'Opera di Roma	Baths of Caracalla	Italy: Rome	Summer Festival
Utah Festival Opera & Musical Theatre	Ellen Eccles Theatre and Utah Theatre	United States: Logan, Utah	Performs 5-6 works of Opera and Musical Theatre in two venues.
Verbier Festival and Academy	Salle Médran	Switzerland: Verbier	
Waterperry Opera Festival	Waterperry Gardens	United Kingdom: Oxfordshire	Country house opera
Wexford Festival Opera	Wexford Opera House	Ireland: Wexford	Rare works
Vicenza Opera Festival	Teatro Olimpico	Italy: Vicenza	Roman theatre, Ivan Fischer Opera Company
Wiener Festwochen	Theater an der Wien	Austria: Vienna	Contemporary works
Wolf Trap Opera Company	Filene Center	United States: Vienna, Virginia	

== See also ==
- Lists of festivals
- Lists of opera companies
