= List of business schools in South Carolina =

This is a list of business schools in South Carolina, arranged in alphabetical order.

School	Founded	Parent University	City	AACSB Accreditation
Baker School of Business	2002	The Citadel, The Military College of South Carolina	Charleston	Yes
College of Business and Behavioral Sciences		Clemson University	Clemson	Yes
The E. Craig Wall, Sr. College of Business Administration		Coastal Carolina University	Conway	Yes
College of Charleston School of Business and Economics	1984	College of Charleston	Charleston	Yes
School of Business		Francis Marion University	Florence	Yes
Darla Moore School of Business	1919	University of South Carolina Columbia	Columbia	Yes
School of Business Administration		University of South Carolina Aiken	Aiken	Yes
George Dean Johnson Jr., College of Business Administration and Economics		University of South Carolina Upstate	Spartanburg	
College of Business and Applied Professional Sciences		South Carolina State University	Orangeburg	
College of Business Administration		Winthrop University	Rock Hill	
