= Country house opera =

Opera performed at a country house

Country house opera is opera performed at a country house, whether in the house itself, in the grounds, or in an adapted or purpose built theatre on the grounds. It is a feature in particular of the English summer. Country house opera is usually initiated by private enthusiasts, and relies almost exclusively upon private funding. This distinguishes it from the UK's state subsidised opera companies which, like most opera houses around the world, are based in city centres. Black tie is often de rigueur, in contrast with the Royal Opera House in London and other city operas where casual clothing is often acceptable.

The performances of country house opera are generally planned to provide a leisurely and elegant experience, with time for picnics on the lawns or a full meal during the often-lengthy interval, and often start in the late afternoon:

"The English have always liked picnicking in the summer and if you can throw in a bit of entertainment, then that's even better" said a former manager at the Sydney Opera House, attributing the popularity of country house opera in England to "the wonderful adventurous spirit of the British.... The British like to go out and find a new place. No one in Australia would go out if they had to take a picnic and it was going to rain."

The most important landmark in country house opera was the opening of Glyndebourne Opera House in 1934. The Glyndebourne Festival Opera company has gradually expanded so that it now has a 1,200-seat theatre and it has become one of the most prominent opera companies in the United Kingdom, performing both at its home venue and on tour.

While other companies, which put on a regular summer season often include works from the standard repertoire, some specialise in particular composers or particular periods. Existing companies include Garsington Opera, Dorset Opera Festival at Bryanston in Dorset, Nevill Holt Opera at Nevill Holt Hall in Leicestershire, Longborough Festival Opera in Gloucestershire, Grange Park Opera in Surrey, Bampton Classical Opera and Waterperry Opera Festival in Oxfordshire, Bury Court Opera in Bentley near Farnham, Surrey, The Grange Festival at Northington, Hampshire and Opéra de Baugé, established by an English family in the Loire Valley, France. The country opera house tradition has inspired opera performances in similar settings outside England, such as Stålboga Summer Opera in Sweden.

There are also a number of touring companies that tour to several country houses each summer, which include Opera Project, "a touring company that plays at West Green, Iford Manor and many other venues round the country."

== See also ==
- Country house theatre
- List of opera festivals
