= Sottile Theater =

Sottile Theatre
- Gloria Theater
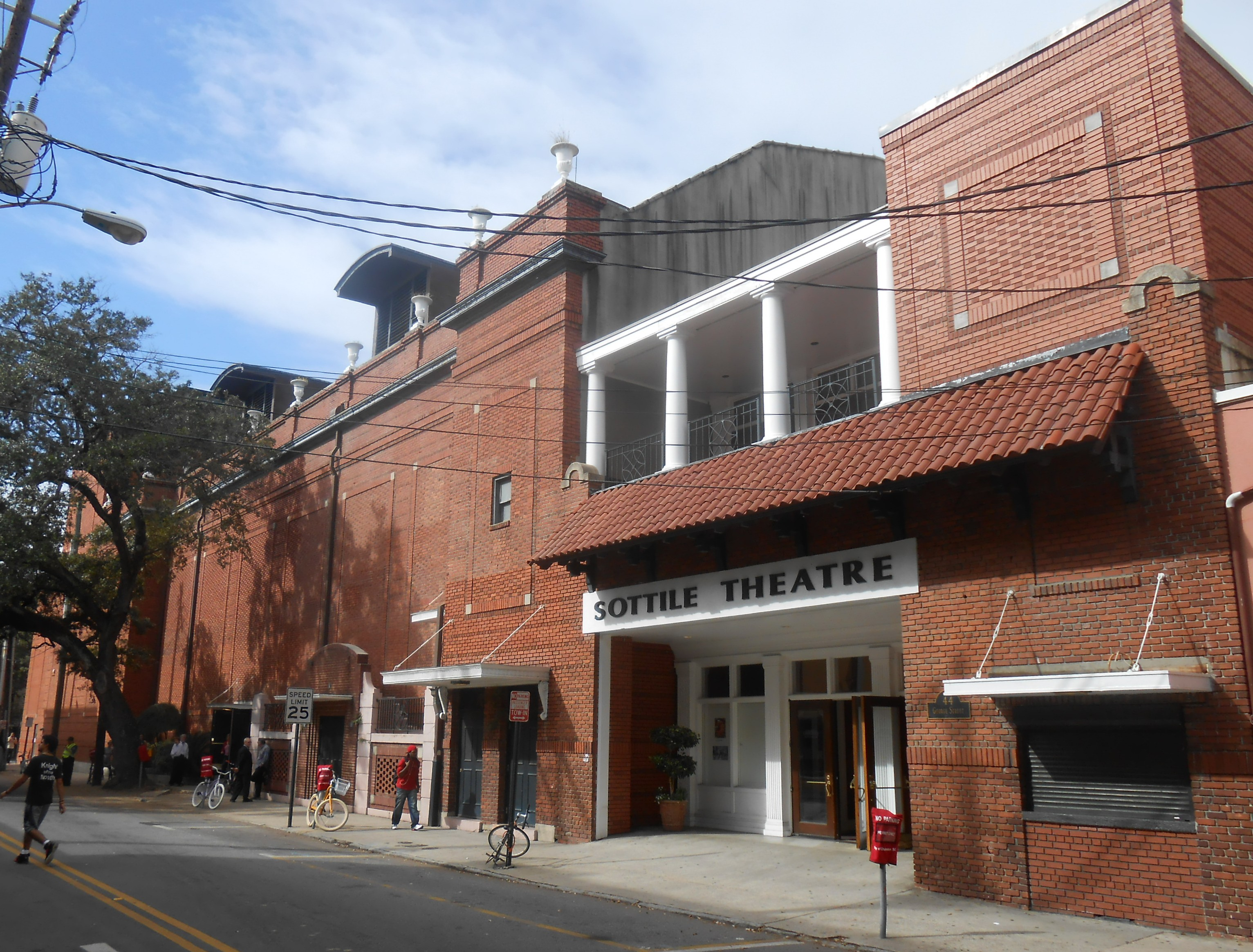
- Interactive map of Sottile Theatre
- Address: 44 George St. Charleston, South Carolina; United States
- Coordinates: 32°47′3″N 79°56′8″W
- Owner: College of Charleston
- Operator: College of Charleston
- Capacity: 785
- Type: small movie palace
- Current use: performing arts venue

Construction
- Opened: August 20, 1927
- Reopened: 1990
- Years active: 1927-1974, 1990-present
- Architects: C.K. Howell and J.D. Newcomer

Website
- sottile.cofc.edu

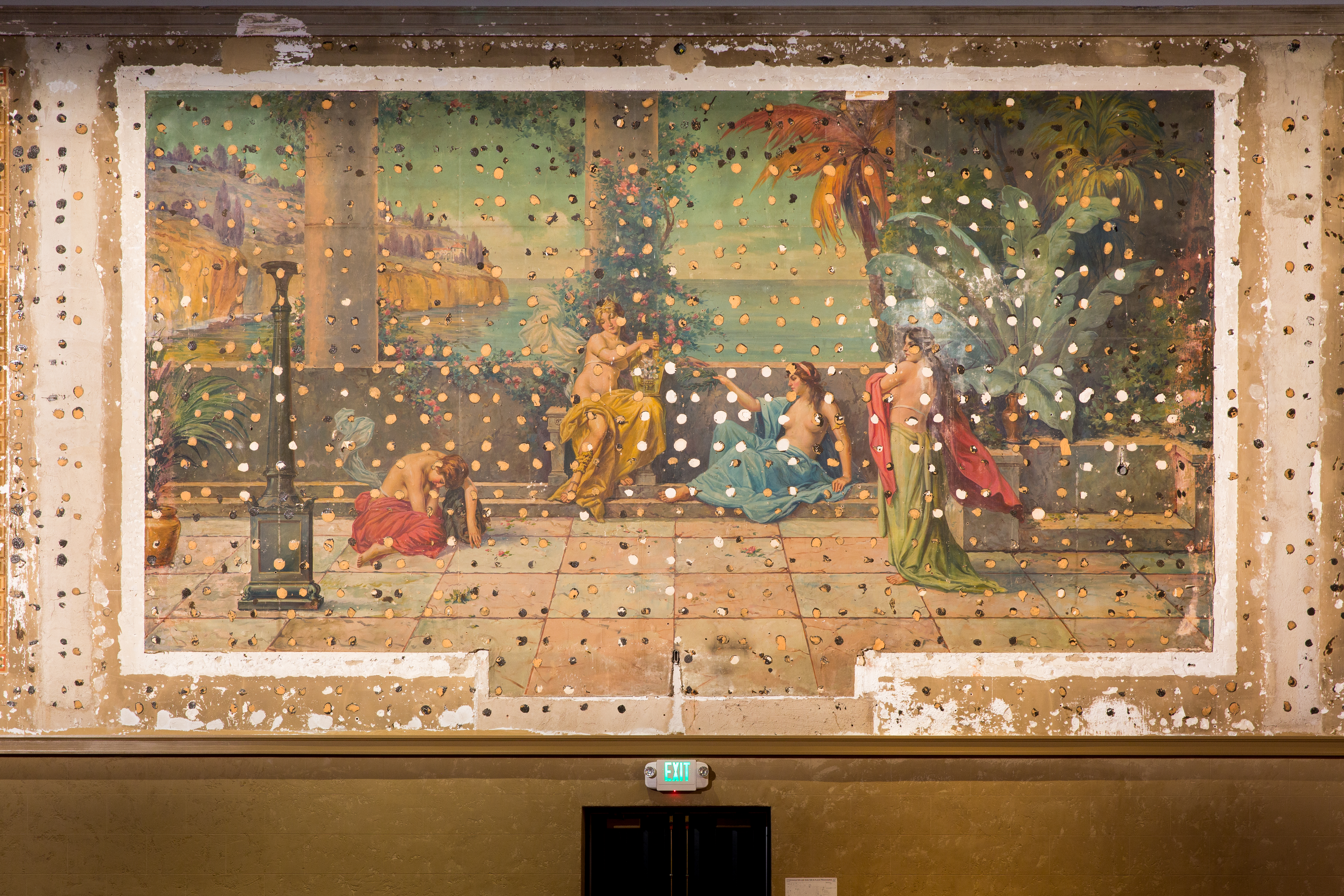
Sottile Theatre Murals

The Sottile Theatre is a theater in downtown Charleston, South Carolina. It is owned by the College of Charleston and is a rental venue used by many local, regional and national performing arts groups including Spoleto Festival USA. It has 785 seats and was built in the 1920s by Albert Sottile.

== History ==
The Theatre was built by Mr. Albert Sottile, President of Pastime Amusement Company. It was designed by nationally renowned architect C.K. Howell, who also built Charleston's Garden Theater in 1918. A building permit was pulled for a building costing $105,000 in late February or early March 1921, and construction began in 1922. It was originally named the Gloria Theater and opened its doors on August 20, 1927, showing Norma Shearer's After Midnight. With 2,000 seats, the theatre was the largest of its kind in the state of South Carolina.

The Theatre served as both a vaudeville house and movie theatre and was designed as a smaller example of the great movie palaces of the era. The South Carolina premiere of Gone with the Wind, which highlighted the "charm and grace" of Charleston, took place at the Gloria Theater with members of the cast in attendance, including Charleston's own Alicia Rhett who portrayed India Wilkes in the film.

The theater was reworked in 1966, but was not used as a theater for several years.

== Restoration ==
The College of Charleston bought the former Gloria Theater in 1976 and planned on restoring it as a 1,000 to 1,200 seat venue. For ten years, however, the building was simply used as storage. College of Charleston President Harry M. Lightsey, Jr., led efforts to refurbish the theatre in 1986, and it reopened in February 1990. In 1987, the owners of the King St. frontage donated that portion of the building to the College of Charleston which had previously owned only the auditorium portion of the building to the rear (fronting on George St.). The federal government approved $1.2 million of support for the renovation in 1989. The wide-reaching renovations preserved many of the unique features of the original theater, and added considerable new spaces and modern conveniences to the facility. The stage was expanded by the construction of a twelve foot apron, and the original orchestra pit was enlarged to accommodate more complex musical productions. A large two-story wing was added to the building to provide expanded dressing rooms and scenery storage.

As the College of Charleston made improvements to the Sottile Theatre in early 2011, it discovered two large-scale murals hiding beneath acoustic tiles. Painted on canvas by Italian artists from New York City during the theatre's construction in the 1920s, one scene depicts a centaur and nymphs before a forested and mountainous background. The other shows Classical figures celebrating music and drama before a blue-green sea. The murals were unveiled in 1927 during the theatre's grand opening. The College of Charleston has started to restore these masterpieces, already removing one mural for safekeeping and repair. The other mural has been uncovered and left hanging, its blemishes, damage and deterioration on display to theatre patrons, including the audiences of Spoleto Festival USA. Much of the restoration work will involve remediation of the many spots of glue used to attach acoustic tiles to the murals decades ago.

== Today ==
The main auditorium still features a shimmering blue sky-like dome with twinkling stars created from lights above. Side archways are covered with ornamental ironwork and the original domed ceiling is surrounded by a plaster oculus. The stage is framed by a proscenium trimmed with molding. The lobbies were completely renovated and a new second floor lobby was constructed to serve the balconies. The second floor plaza opens onto a covered porch that overlooks George Street.
