= St James' Church, Longborough =

Coordinates: 51.9659°N 1.7408°W

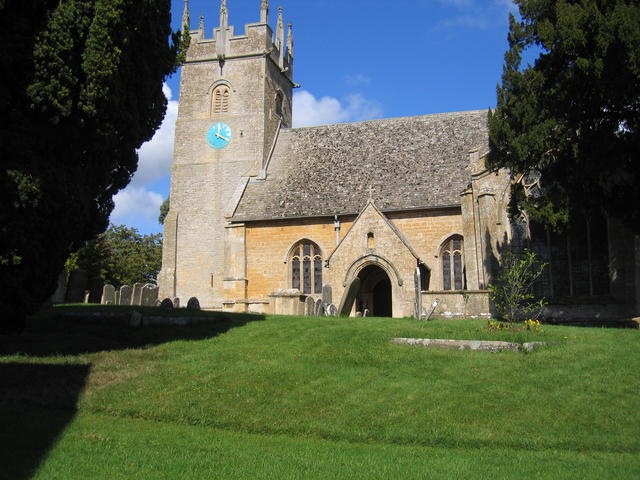
- St James' Church, Longborough, from the south

- Location in Gloucestershire
- OS grid reference: SP 179 297
- Location: Longborough, Gloucestershire
- Country: England
- Denomination: Anglican
- Website: St James, Longborough

History
- Status: Parish church

Architecture
- Functional status: Active
- Heritage designation: Grade I
- Designated: 25 August 1960
- Architectural type: Church

Administration
- Province: Canterbury
- Diocese: Gloucester
- Archdeaconry: Cheltenham
- Deanery: Stow
- Parish: Longborough with Sezincote

Clergy
- Rector: Revd Stephen M. Wookey

St James' Church is the Church of England parish church of Longborough, Gloucestershire, England. It is in the deanery of Stow, the archdeaconry of Cheltenham and the diocese of Gloucester. Its benefice is combined with those of St David, Moreton-in-Marsh, St Mary, Batsford, St Thomas of Canterbury, Todenham, and St Leonard, Lower Lemington. It contains fabric from the 12th century and is recorded in the National Heritage List for England as a designated Grade I listed building.

== History ==
The earliest record of the building is in 1192, when a priest was murdered in the church. The present church was built in the 12th century; initially it was a simple building consisting of a nave and chancel. During the following century the west tower was added in Early English style, with a pyramidal roof, and the south porch was built. In the 14th century the chancel was refurbished in Decorated style. The south transept, known as the Leigh aisle, was added as a chantry chapel in a more flamboyant architectural style than the rest of the church. A bellcote was built on the east end of the nave roof. During the following century the pyramidal roof was removed from the tower, and battlements, pinnacles and gargoyles were added to it. The windows in the nave were built; they are in Perpendicular style. Towards the end of that century, or during the following century, a tiled floor was constructed.

In the 17th century a tomb to the memory of Sir William Leigh was added to the south transept, and a turret clock was installed. In 1822–23, the Sezincote Chapel was built with a private door, for the use of members of the family living at Sezincote House. This formed a north transept, with accommodation for the family at church services on an upper floor, and a vault for family burials below. It was designed by Charles Robert Cockerell in Perpendicular style, with battlements matching those elsewhere on the church. In the 20th century the Sezincote Chapel, no longer in use by the family, was made accessible from the interior of the church, and the fireplace in its northeast corner was blocked.

== Architecture ==
=== Exterior ===
The church is constructed in limestone with a stone slate roof. Its plan is cruciform, consisting of a nave with north and south transepts and a south porch, a chancel with a vestry to the north, and a west tower. The tower has three stages. There is a clock face on the south side of the middle stage, and in the top stage are two-light belfry windows on each side. Above this is a string course with eight gargoyles, and around the summit is a battlemented parapet with eight crocketted pinnacles. At the east end of the nave roof is an open bellcote. The church has a three-light east window, two three-light west windows, and a large five-light window in the south transept. Inside the porch are stone benches on each side.

=== Interior ===
In the chancel is an aumbry on the north wall and a piscina and a priest's door in the south wall. The former Sezincote Chapel in the upper floor of the north transept is approached by an iron stairway. The south transept has a reredos in its east wall and in its west windows are fragments of medieval stained glass. Along its south wall are two tombs bearing effigies. The tomb to the east carries the weathered 14th-century effigy of an unknown knight. The tomb to the west is the memorial of Sir William Leigh who died in 1631. On its top are life-sized effigies of Sir William and his wife Elizabeth, and two of their children. On its side are the figures of two sons and three daughters, all kneeling. The font is octagonal and dates from the 14th century. The pews, choir stalls, altar and pulpit all date from the 19th century; the pulpit is in Bath stone. The stained glass in the two windows on the south side of the nave was made by Ward and Hughes; the windows depict the Marriage at Cana and Christ's Blessing of the Children. The two windows in the Sezincote Chapel commemorate F. B. Dugdale, VC who served in the Boer War and was killed in a hunting accident in 1902.

There is a ring of six bells. The oldest two bells date from 1680, and were cast by Richard Keene of Woodstock. A third bell was cast by Abel Rudhall of Gloucester in 1739, and two bells are by Henry I. Bond of Burford and are dated 1898. The sixth bell is by John Taylor of Loughborough and dates from a restoration of the bells in 1987. The Sanctus bell in the bellcote was made by Bond and is also dated 1898. The two-manual pipe organ dates from 1903 and was made by Nicholson and Son of Great Malvern. It was cleaned and overhauled by the same company in 2002.

== External features ==
In the churchyard is a monument to the memory of Samuel Rowsham and Elizabeth (?) which dates from the late 18th to the early 19th century. It is a Grade II listed building. To the west of the church is the war grave of a Royal Artillery soldier of World War II.
