= Douglas W. Hubbard =

American decision scientist

Douglas Hubbard is an American management consultant, speaker, and author in decision sciences and actuarial science.

== Career ==
Hubbard was a business analyst at Coopers & Lybrand in 1988 after finishing his MBA at the University of South Dakota. He formed Hubbard Decision Research in 1998.

== Views ==
He criticizes several popular methods and standards in organizational risk management and decision-making. He argues that extensive research on methods such as "risk matrices," weighted decision-making scores, and expert intuition is inferior to certain quantitative methods.

Hubbard is known for asserting that everything can be measured, and that initial measurements are the most valuable as they reduce the greatest amounts of uncertainty.

== Selected publications ==
=== Books ===
- How to Measure Anything: Finding the Value of Intangibles in Business. Wiley. 2007. doi:10.1002/9781118983836. ISBN 9781118983836.
- The Failure of Risk Management: Why It's Broken and How to Fix It. Wiley. 2009. doi:10.1002/9781119521914. ISBN 9781119198536.
- Pulse: The New Science of Harnessing Internet Buzz to Track Threats and Opportunities. Wiley. 2011. doi:10.1002/9781119200956. ISBN 9781119200956.
- How to Measure Anything in Cybersecurity Risk. Wiley. 2016. doi:10.1002/9781119892335. ISBN 9781119162315.

His first two books are listed on the Book List for the Society of Actuaries Exam Prep.

His books are on the reading list at School of Business and Economics (College of Charleston), Jon M. Huntsman School of Business (Utah State University), and Carl H. Lindner College of Business (University of Cincinnati).

=== Other publications ===
- Shepherd, K., Hubbard, D., Fenton, N., Claxton, K., Luedeling, E., & deLeeuw, J. (2015). Policy: Development goals should enable decision-making. Nature. July 2015. https://doi.org/10.1038/523152a
- Hubbard, D., & Evans, D. (2010). Problems with scoring methods and ordinal scales in risk assessment. IBM Journal of Research and Development, 54(3), 2–1. doi.org/10.1147/jrd.2010.2042914
- Hubbard, D., & Samuelson, D. A. (2009). Analysis placebos: The difference between perceived and real benefits of risk analysis and decision models. Analytics Magazine. Fall 2009.
- Hubbard, D., & Samuelson, D. A. (2009). Modeling Without Measurements: How the decision analysis culture's lack of empiricism reduces its effectiveness. OR/MS Today, 36(5), 26–31.
- Hubbard, D. (2009). It's all an illusion: The perception that many things are immeasurable is common — it's also an illusion. ArchitectureBoston. 11(5).
- Hubbard, D. (2003). Expert analysis: An effective measure. CIO: ROIowa. August 2003.
- Mayor, T., & Hubbard, D. (2001). Case study: Red light, green light. CIO Enterprise Magazine. October, 2001.
- Worthen, B., & Hubbard., D. (2001). Case Study: Two Teams are better than one. CIO Enterprise Magazine. 2001.
- Hubbard, D. W. (1997). Risk vs. return. InformationWeek, (637), 105.

== Awards ==
- 2017 PaloAlto Networks Cybersecurity Canon Award
- 2017 Royal Society of Arts, Manufactures and Commerce Fellow
