= Frederic Brooks Dugdale =

Recipient of the Victoria Cross

- Born: 21 October 1877; Burnley, Lancashire
- Died: 13 November 1902 (aged 25); Charingworth, Gloucestershire
- Burial place: Longborough Churchyard
- Military career
- Allegiance: United Kingdom
- Branch: British Army
- Service years: 1899–1902
- Rank: Lieutenant
- Units: 5th Lancers
- Conflicts: Second Boer War
- Awards: Victoria Cross

Lieutenant Frederic Brooks Dugdale VC (21 October 1877 – 13 November 1902) was an English British Army officer and recipient of the Victoria Cross, the highest and most prestigious award for gallantry in the face of the enemy that can be awarded to British and Commonwealth forces.

== Biography ==
Dugdale was born in 1877, the youngest son of Colonel James Dugdale, of Sezincot, Moreton in the Marsh, Gloucestershire. He was commissioned into the British Army as a second-lieutenant in the 5th Lancers in October 1899. The outbreak of the Second Boer War the same month saw the regiment sent to South Africa, where they took part in the Ladysmith Relief Column. He was promoted to the rank of lieutenant in May 1900.

He was 23 years old serving during the Second Boer War when the following deed took place on 3 March 1901 near Derby, South Africa for which he was awarded the Victoria Cross.

On 3rd March, 1901, Lieutenant Dugdale, who was in command of a small outpost near Derby, having been ordered to retire, his patrol came under a heavy fire at a range of about 250 yards, and a Sergeant, two men, and a horse were hit. Lieutenant Dugdale dismounted and placed one of the wounded men on his own horse; he then caught another horse, galloped up to a wounded man and took him up behind him, and brought both men safely out of action.

He had a severe attack of enteric fever, and after his recovery served with General John French in the Cape Colony. Staying with his regiment in South Africa until the war ended in May 1902, he then left for the United Kingdom on the SS Briton two months later. Shortly after his return, he was killed in a horse riding accident whilst riding with the North Cotswold Hounds, near Charingworth, Gloucestershire, England, on 13 November 1902. He was buried at Longborough, near Moreton in Marsh.

== The medal ==
His Victoria Cross is displayed at The Royal Lancers and Nottinghamshire Yeomanry Museum, Thoresby Park, Nottinghamshire, England.

== See also ==
- List of horse accidents
