= Longborough Festival Opera =

Opera festival in England

Longborough Festival Opera is a summer opera festival in the English Cotswolds village of Longborough in north Gloucestershire. It can trace its roots back to 1991 as a series of concerts in the home of its founders, local property developer Martin Graham and his wife Lizzie. Martin Graham died in 2025 aged 83, but the Graham family remains deeply involved. Martin and Lizzie's daughter, the stage director Polly Graham, was appointed Artistic Director in 2018 and Emily Gottlieb joined as Executive Director in 2024.

Longborough Festival Opera is a charity, established in 2000, which is led by an independent board of trustees. It receives no public grant funding nor any revenue from the Graham family, and relies on ticket sales and the generosity of philanthropists, trusts and foundations, members and audiences.

== Beginnings ==
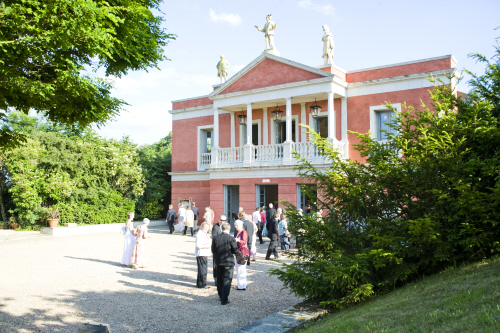

Longborough Festival Opera began as Banks Fee Opera, named after the Grahams' family home. It soon moved from the main house to a temporary stage in the courtyard of the stable block, with productions supplied by Travelling Opera, a small touring opera company.

The Grahams sold Banks Fee in the mid-1990s and moved to a house that Martin built on adjacent land with views over the Evenlode Valley. In 1998 they started their own productions, ending their relationship with the touring company and moving to a converted barn in the grounds of their new home. In 2006, the orchestra pit was extended underneath the stage to try to reproduce the effect at Bayreuth, accommodating up to 70 players, and the roof was raised to improve the acoustics. The barn thus became a 500-seat theatre, equipped with seats recycled from the Royal Opera House and topped by statues of Wagner, Verdi and Mozart made by Jim Keeling of Whichford Pottery. It has been suggested that the Longborough venue is modelled to look like Wagner's own opera house at Bayreuth although Graham himself described it as 'just a big shed'.

== Longborough, Wagner and other repertoire ==
The Festival has established a reputation for performing the works of Richard Wagner under the musical leadership of Anthony Negus. This began with the reduced version of the Ring Cycle which was adapted for the City of Birmingham Touring Opera by Graham Vick and Jonathan Dove. The opera director Alan Privett and his wife, the opera singer Jenny Miller, were involved in this project from the beginning and Anthony Negus joined in 2000. 2004 saw the final production of what had become known as the 'baby Ring', with Donald McIntyre as Wotan. In 2013 the Festival staged three full-length productions of the complete Ring Cycle, directed by Alan Privett, becoming the first UK Opera Festival to present the Ring in full. In 2019 the company embarked on a new Ring, directed by Amy Lane, culminating in another full cycle in 2024.

Alongside its interest in the work of Wagner, the festival has broadened its ambitions across other repertoire, staging Erich Wolfgang Korngold's Die tote Stadt in 2022, Avner Dorman's Wahnfried and Debussy's Pelléas et Mélisande in 2025. In 2026, Longborough collaborated with The Academy of Ancient Music to stage Handel's opera Orlando with mezzo-soprano Beth Taylor, a former Longborough Emerging Artist, in the title role.

== Music Directors ==
The founding Music Director of Longborough was Anthony Negus, who joined the company in 2000 and has led the musical direction of productions of opera by, or influenced by, Wagner. Negus became Conductor Laureate at the end of the 2026 Festival and has been succeeded by Christopher Ward, previously Generalmusikdirektor of Theater Aachen.

== Emerging Artists, Youth Company and Community Chorus ==
Longborough operates an Emerging Artist Programme offering solo roles and chorus positions in its productions for singers at the beginning of their careers or returning to the profession after a break.

Longborough's Youth Company offers 7 to 21 year-olds the opportunity to develop their singing and creative skills and gain stage experience, through coaching by a team of vocal, drama and movement specialists. Members have the opportunity to take part in the Youth Chorus in main stage productions, showcases and local concerts.

Longborough has a Community Chorus made up of local amateur singers who appear alongside the professional chorus in one of the mainstage productions each year.

== Education in schools ==
Longborough's music staff provide weekly singing lessons in local primary schools through its Singing Schools programme, with a new scholarship introduced in 2025 to offer recipients the opportunity to perform in the Longborough Youth Chorus in a production in the summer festival. Another schools scheme, Playground Opera, reimagines classic operas to make them accessible for children. Workshops with local secondary schools take place every year, involving interactive sessions with live performances and discussions.

== See also ==
- Country house opera
- List of opera companies in Europe
- List of opera festivals
