= Municipal college =

A municipal college is a city-supported institution of higher learning.

The oldest municipal college in the United States is the College of Charleston located in historic Charleston, South Carolina. The College of Charleston is also the thirteenth oldest institution of higher education in the country. The College was founded in 1770 and chartered in 1785.

Currently, there remain only three municipal colleges under partial city control, the City University of New York system, Quincy College in Quincy, Massachusetts, and Washburn University in Topeka, Kansas. Other historical municipal colleges and Universities include the University of Louisville, the University of Cincinnati, Wichita State University, University of Toledo, University of Nebraska Omaha, the University of Akron, Wayne State University in Detroit, and Ohio University in Athens, Ohio.
