= Kållandsö =

Island in lake Vänern in Sweden

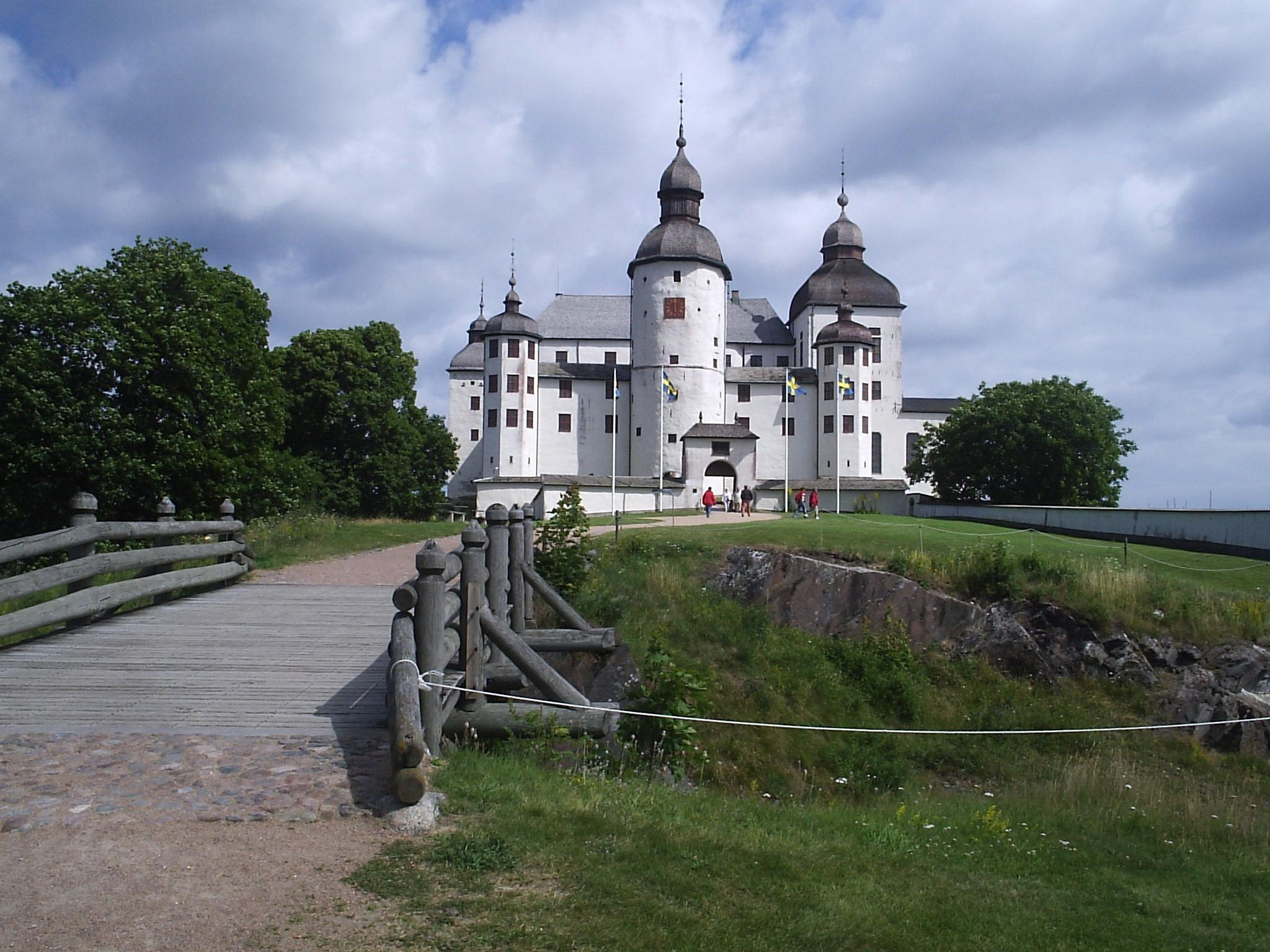
- Läckö Castle on Kållandsö
- Interactive map of Kållandsö

Geography
- Location: Vänern
- Coordinates: 58°39′54″N 13°07′10″E
- Area: 56.78 km^{2} (21.92 sq mi)

Administration
- Sweden
- County: Västra Götaland
- Municipality: Lidköping

Kållandsö is an island in lake Vänern in Sweden. With an area of 56.78 km² it is the second largest island in the lake after Torsö. It is the northernmost part of the municipality of Lidköping. Kållandsö and the surrounding archipelago has about 1,100 inhabitants.

Because of its location and its attractions like Läckö Castle, the island is a popular tourist destination.
