= Dalhalla =

Open-air theatre in Rättvik Municipality, Sweden

Coordinates: 60°56′55″N 15°06′15″E

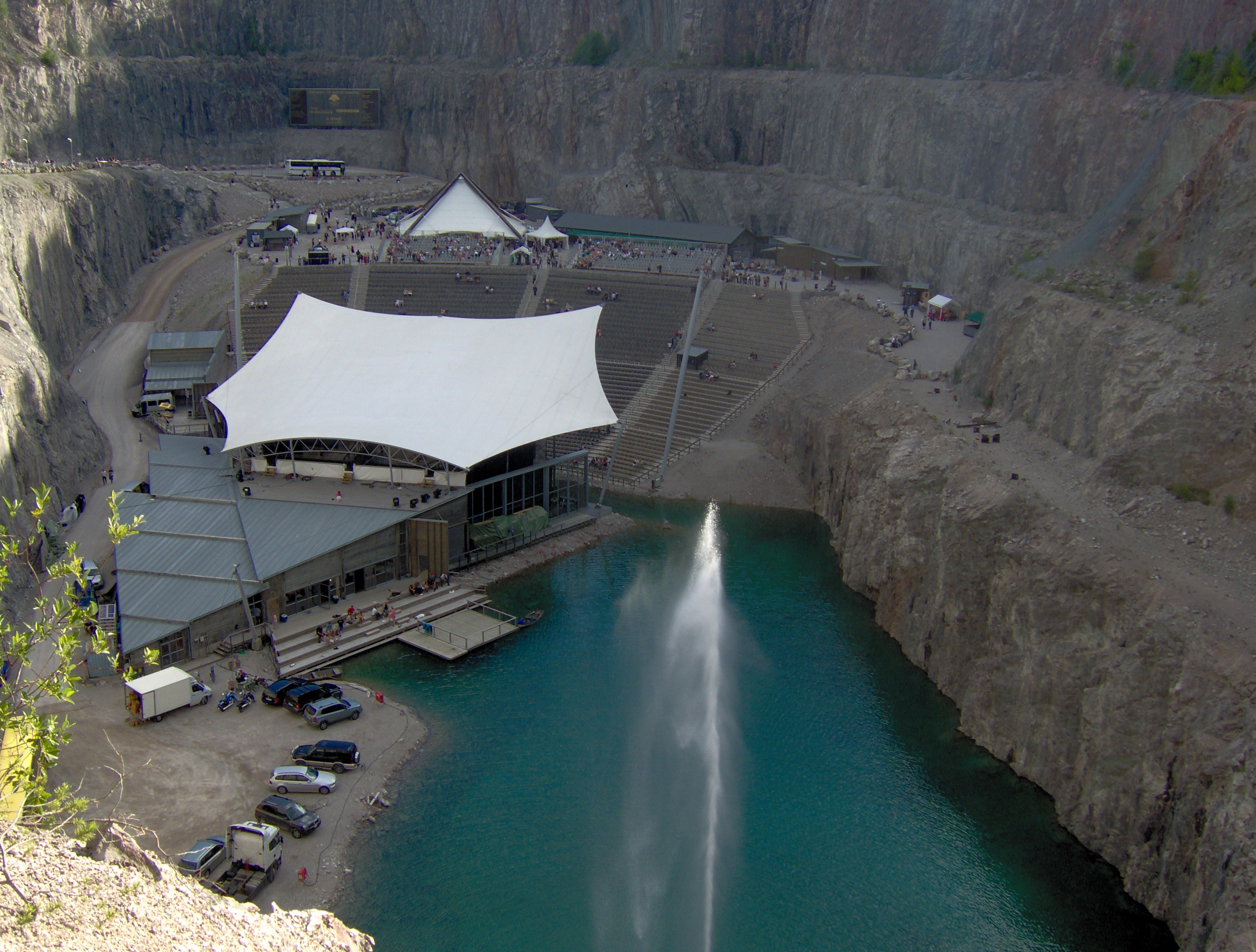
Overview of Dalhalla in July 2007.

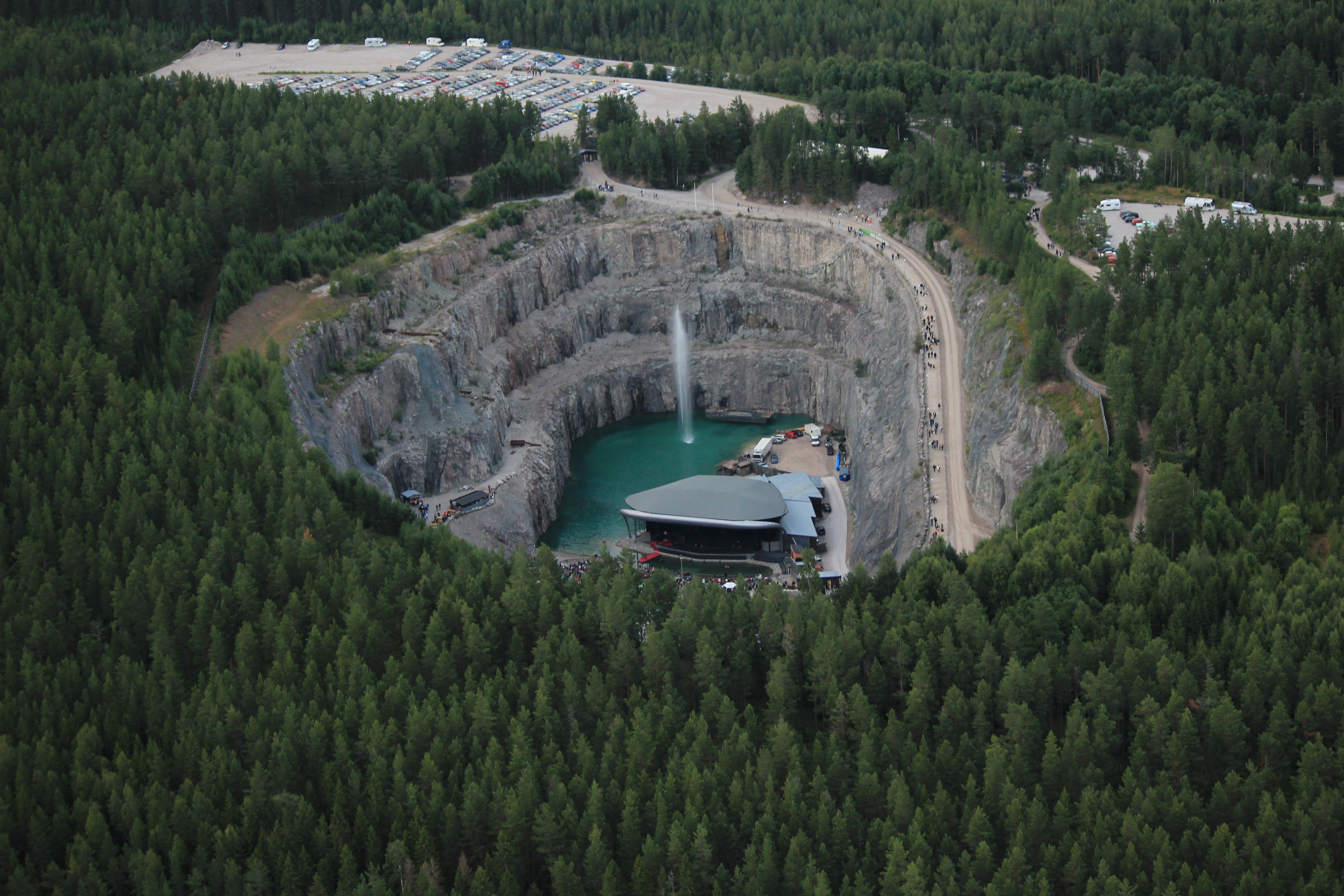
Aerial view of Dalhalla

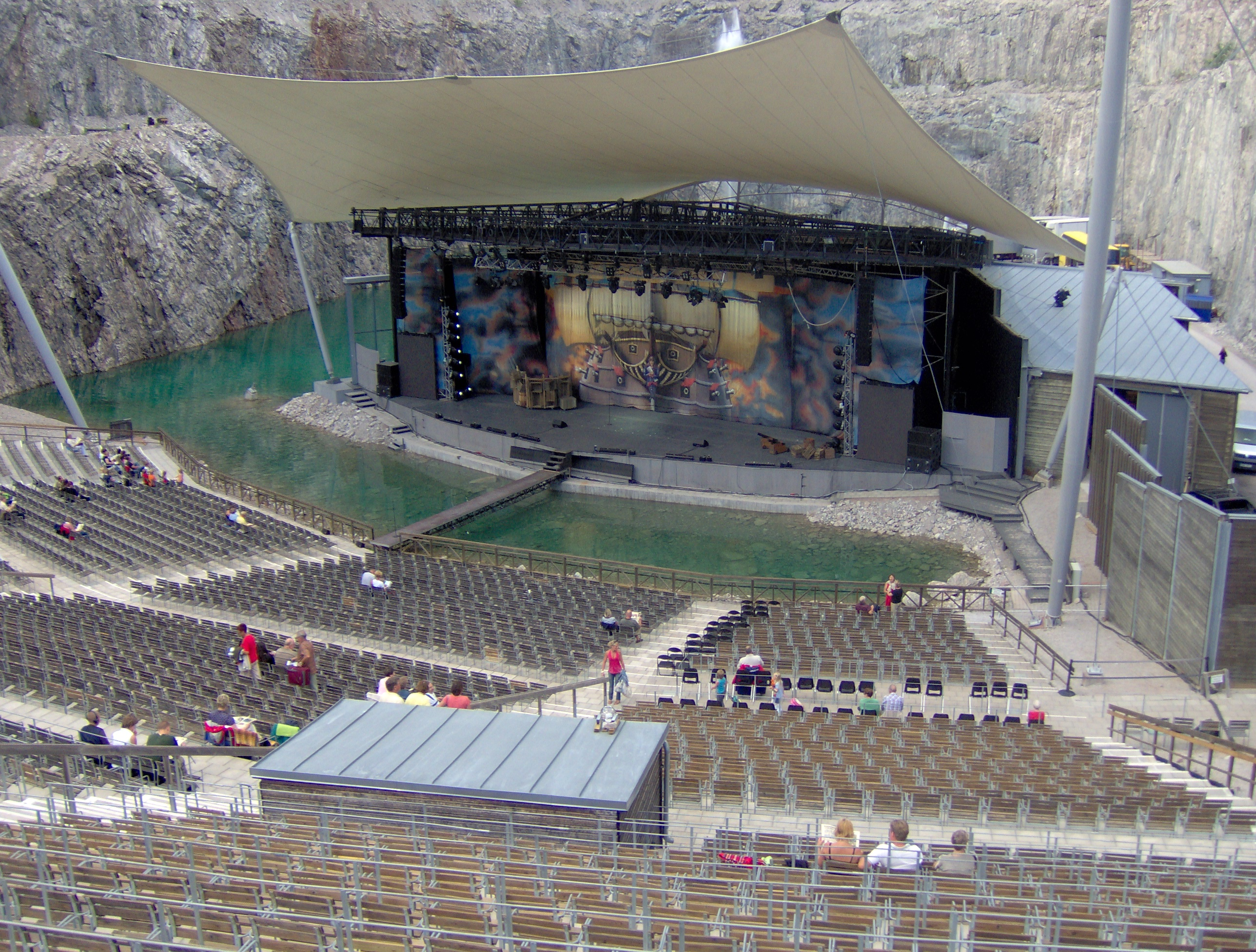
Dalhalla's stage before the show "Rhapsody in Rock" in July 2007

Dalhalla is an open air theatre located in a former limestone quarry, and is used as a summer music venue. It is located 7 km (4.3 mi) north of Lake Siljan and the municipality of Rättvik in Dalarna, central Sweden.

The quarry, previously known as Draggängarna, is 60 m (200 ft) deep, 400 m (1,300 ft) long and 175 m (574 ft) wide. It was in operation until 1990. The open air theater was opened in 1995 and currently has 6,000 seats. The acoustical qualities are comparable to the best outdoor stages in Europe.

Dalhalla presents 20-30 events each summer, from June to the beginning of September with a combination of opera, choral works, jazz and popular concerts making up the bulk of the program.

In 2005, guest performers came from the Bolshoi Theatre in Moscow, and Mikis Theodorakis celebrated his 80th birthday. In June 2007, English rock group Procol Harum performed with the Gävle Symphony Orchestra and the Dala Sinfonietta Choir, conducted by David Firman.

== See also ==
- List of contemporary amphitheatres
- List of opera festivals
