= Théâtre de l'Archevêché =

Theater in Aix-en-Provence, France

Coordinates: 43°31′54″N 5°26′53″E

The Théâtre de l'Archevêché is a theatre in Aix-en-Provence in southern France and the home of the annual summer Aix-en-Provence Festival of opera.

== See also ==
- List of opera festivals
