= Anthony Negus =

British conductor known for his Wagner interpretations

Anthony Negus CBE
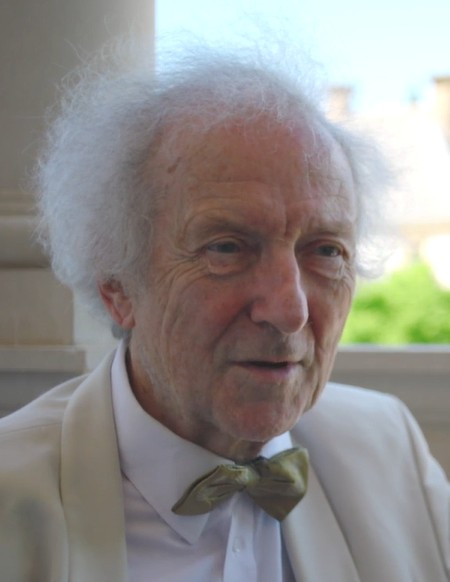
- Negus in 2026

Anthony Richard Negus CBE (born 8 June 1946) is a British classical conductor who has concentrated on works written or influenced by Richard Wagner. He has worked annually with Longborough Festival Opera as its Music Director since 2001, performing acclaimed cycles of Der Ring des Nibelungen in 2002/4, 2013 and 2024. In 2017 Negus was awarded the Goodall Award by The London Wagner Society for "his devotion to the works of Richard Wagner". In 2025 Sir Nicholas Kenyon noted “the outstanding musical direction of Wagner supremo Anthony Negus” in his review of Longborough's production of Pelléas et Mélisande.

In the last decade, Negus has been invited by Melbourne Opera (MO) to conduct German opera, especially Wagner, with four hugely successful performances of Die Meistersinger von Nürnberg in 2025 at the Royal Exhibition Building for which he was awarded the Opera Chaser Critics Award for Outstanding Conductor. In 2023 he conducted two Ring cycles in Bendigo, Victoria, which also earned him the Outstanding Conductor Opera Chaser Award. His 2018 Tristan und Isolde for MO won the coveted Green Room Award for best conductor.

Born to parents who were both professional musicians, Negus was educated at Stowe School before studying clarinet and piano at the Royal College of Music and going on to read Music at Christ Church, Oxford. His first experiences of working as a répétiteur and conducting opera were at the Else Mayer-Lismann Opera Workshop and the London Opera Centre. He went on to study conducting with Franco Ferrara in Sienna and with George Hurst in the UK. He assisted Reginald Goodall on The Valkyrie in 1970 at Sadlers Wells before working as a repetiteur at Wuppertal, where he made his conducting debut with D'Albert'sTiefland. He went on to work as an assistant conductor at Bayreuth Festival and Hamburg State Opera. As a member of the Music Staff of Welsh National Opera (WNO) between 1976 and 2012, he assisted conductors including Sir Richard Armstrong, Sir Charles Mackerras, Vladimir Jurowski and Pierre Boulez. With WNO, Negus assisted Boulez on Pelléas et Mélisande and Goodall on Tristan und Isolde, Parsifal and The Valkyrie and conducted over 150 performances in the UK, Germany, France, Japan and China.

In 1983, aged 36, he conducted the WNO production of Parsifal when Goodall fell ill. Wolfgang Wagner, Head of the Bayreuth Festival and the composer's grandson, came to a performance and said: "It is absolutely astounding what Anthony has done. I was impressed with the love he brought to all aspects of the opera. It was a great personal triumph for him."

Negus has conducted Wagner with the Pittsburgh Symphony Orchestra, Glyndebourne Festival, Grange Park Opera and the New Zealand Symphony Orchestra at the Wellington Festival.

Negus was appointed Commander of the Order of the British Empire (CBE) in the 2026 King's Birthday Honours for services to Opera, particularly Mozart and Wagner, and to Young Artists.

== Personal life ==
He lives in Penarth, South Wales with his wife, the opera Director Carmen Jakobi.
