= Läckö Castle =

Coordinates: 58°40′30″N 13°13′12″E

- Läckö Slott (Swedish)
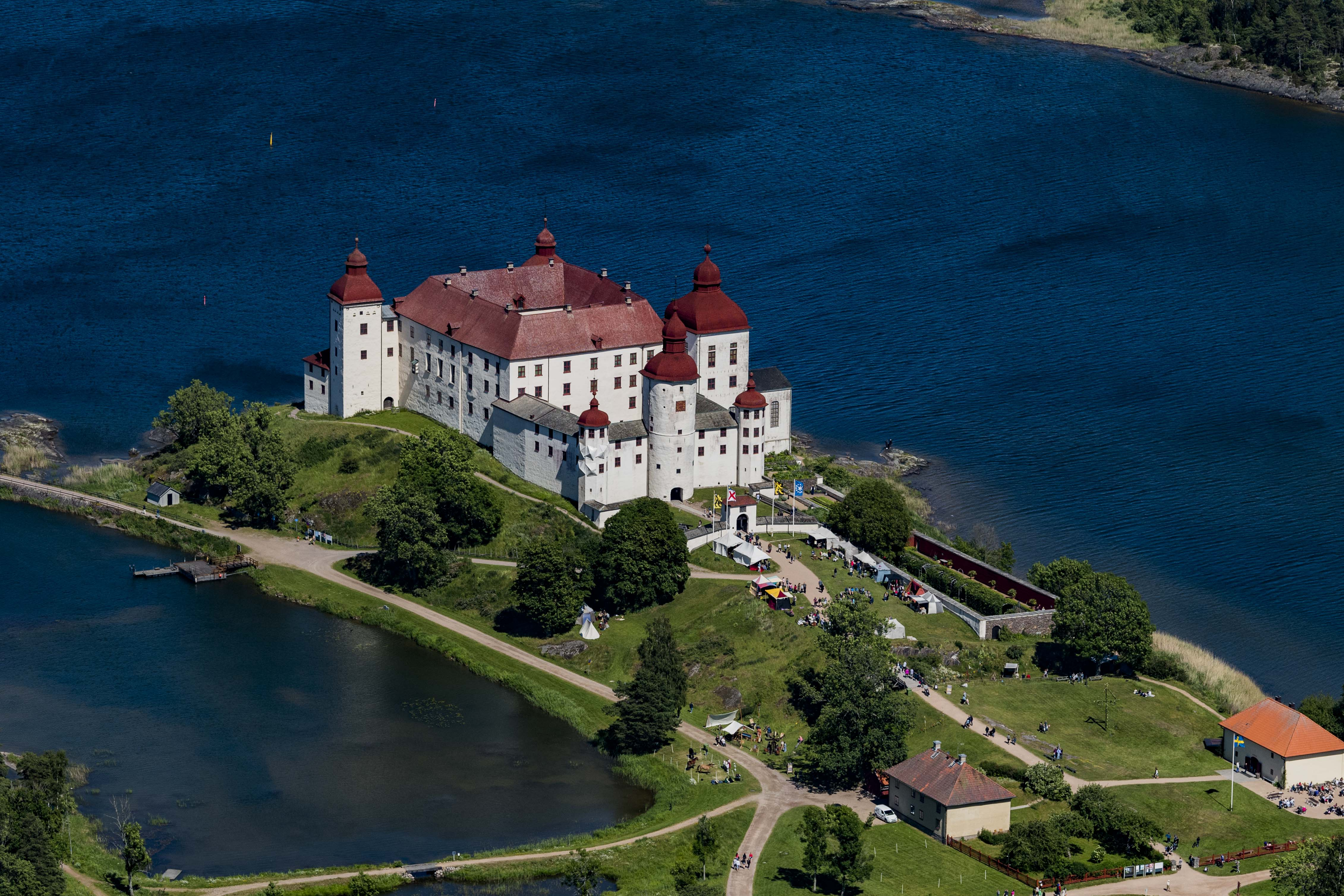
- View of the castle

General information
- Location: Sweden

Läckö Castle (Swedish: Läckö Slott) is a medieval castle in Sweden, located on Kållandsö island on Lake Vänern, 25 kilometers north of Lidköping in Västergötland, Sweden.

== History ==
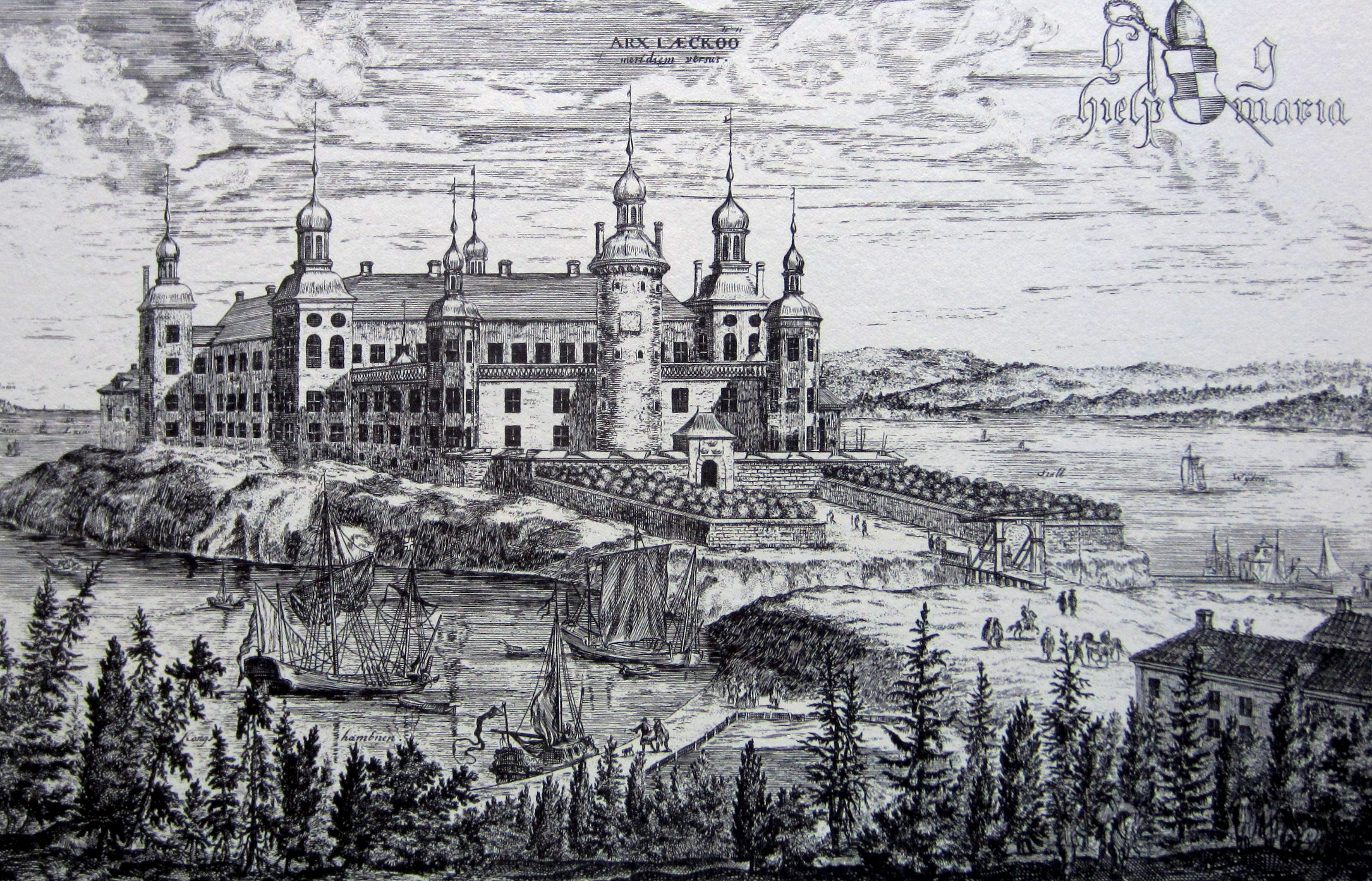
Engraving of Läckö Castle from the late 17th-century book Suecia Antiqua et Hodierna

Brynolf Algotsson, Bishop of the Diocese of Skara, laid the foundations for a fortified castle in 1298 originally as a fort that consisted of two or three houses surrounded by a wall. After a fire during the 1470s, the fort was expanded by Bishop Brynolf Gerlachsson (1458–1505).

Following the Reformation in 1527, King Gustav Vasa took possession. Field Marshal Jacob Pontusson De la Gardie (1583–1652) was granted the property in 1615. Field Marshal de la Gardie embarked on an extensive building spree, including the third floor of the keep. The portal to the main courtyard was added during his period, as were the frescos depicting people and winding plants found in niches, stairwells and the rooms on the third floor.

In 1654, Count Magnus Gabriel De la Gardie (1622–1686) initiated major construction projects at Läckö. A fourth floor was built in the main building and a number of artists were hired to decorate the walls and ceilings of the castle.

Läckö was later granted to Count Carl Gustaf Tessin (1695–1770) in 1752 and in 1810 to General Carl Johan Adlercreutz (1757–1815).

The coat of arms of Läckö Castle, created in 1993

An aerial photograph of Läckö Castle in 1993

Today, Läckö Castle is a national monument and has been managed by the National Property Board since 1993. The National Property Board (Statens fastighetsverk), the Foundation of Läckö Castle (Stiftelsen Läckö Slott) and the National Museum of Fine Arts (Nationalmuseum) work together to maintain and furnish the castle in the style of the Baroque period.

Läckö Castle Opera (Läckö Slottsopera) puts on an annual opera production in the castle's inner courtyard, with performances for about three weeks beginning in the middle of July. La gazzetta and other opera performances have been held here.

== Building ==
A model of Läckö Castle displayed inside the castle

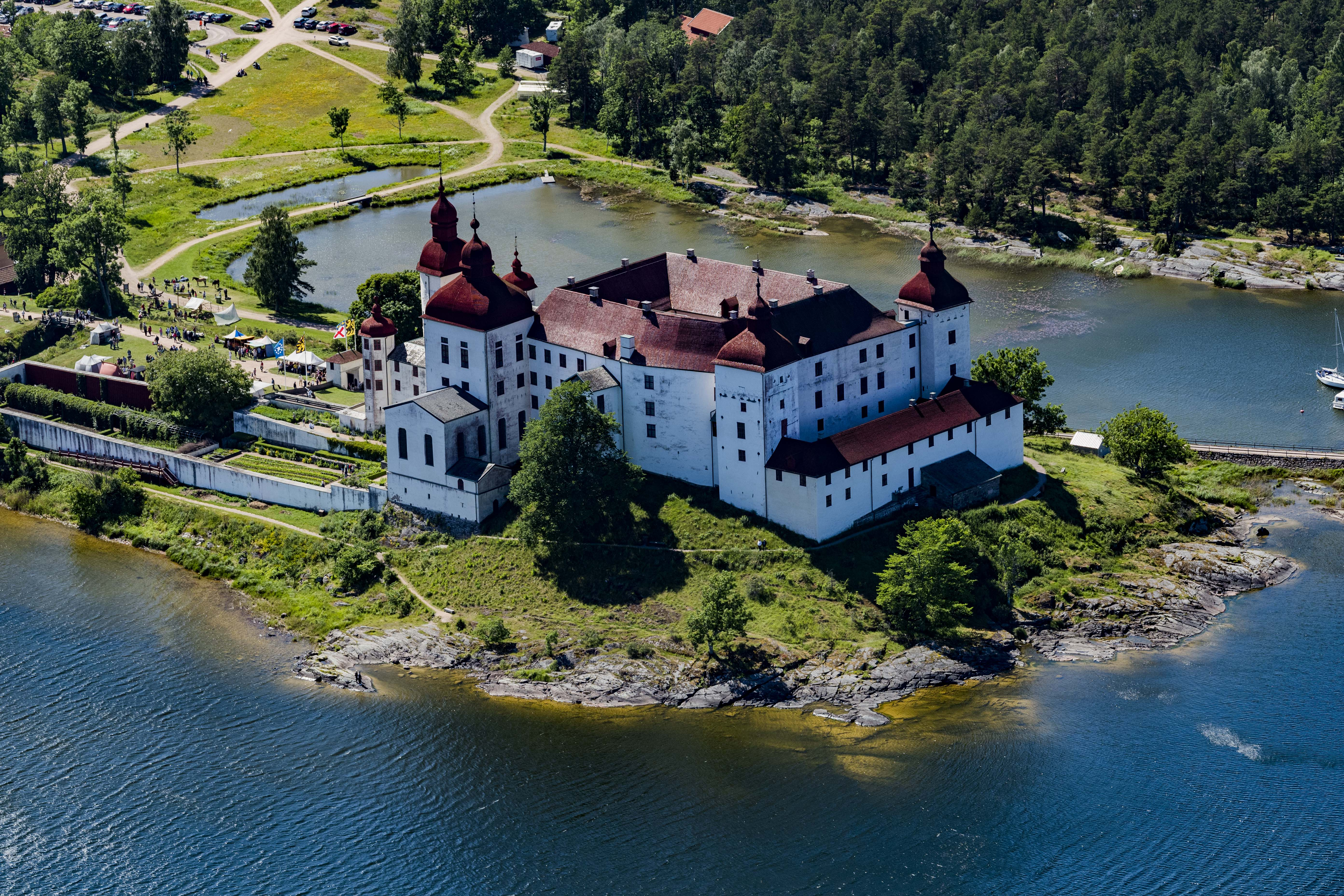
The castle is located on a rocky promontory (headland) on the island of Kållandsö

The main entrance

The castle gardens

=== The medieval castle ===
The castle is situated on a rocky promontory and is predominantly medieval in date, although no major archaeological investigations have been carried out. The original complex consisted of an irregular castellated castle. The curtain wall of the medieval main castle was built of fieldstone and brick, although its original height is unknown. The northern and southern ranges of the main castle probably belong to the earliest construction phase. The main entrance appears to have been in the north, through the present passage to the Köksgården. There were also smaller entrances in the western wall and at the eastern end of the northern curtain wall. In the southern range of the main castle, a well in a basement room probably belongs to the original complex. In the northwestern corner of the courtyard, the foundations of a vaulted cellar were discovered during excavations. It has been established that the cellar was destroyed by fire. In the northeastern corner of the curtain wall, a built-in timber beam was discovered and dendrochronologically dated to 1330.

During a later medieval construction phase, numerous additions were made. The eastern and western ranges were added to the main castle. Two towers were erected at the corners of the northern curtain wall. The eastern tower contains remains of medieval decoration. The upper parts of the towers were rebuilt in later periods. A curtain wall was constructed between the towers and extended towards the lake, forming an outer ward. This wall was later demolished when the Köksgården was built. Within this area is the 27-metre-deep Fläskgraven. Olaus Magnus wrote in 1554 that it had been excavated into the rock by heating the rock with burning pork, thereby forming a shaft. Below the castle rock on the lakeside, at water level, a passage was constructed leading into the well. The structure was probably built as a secret passage providing access into and out of the castle. On the southern side, facing the mainland, an outer ward was constructed. Its walls later partly served as foundations for the building ranges. The semicircular tower at the southernmost end, which is now the main entrance, originally had three storeys. The entrance was probably added at a later date. Above the ground floor is a Gothic rib vault fitted with machicolation openings.

=== Later additions and alterations ===
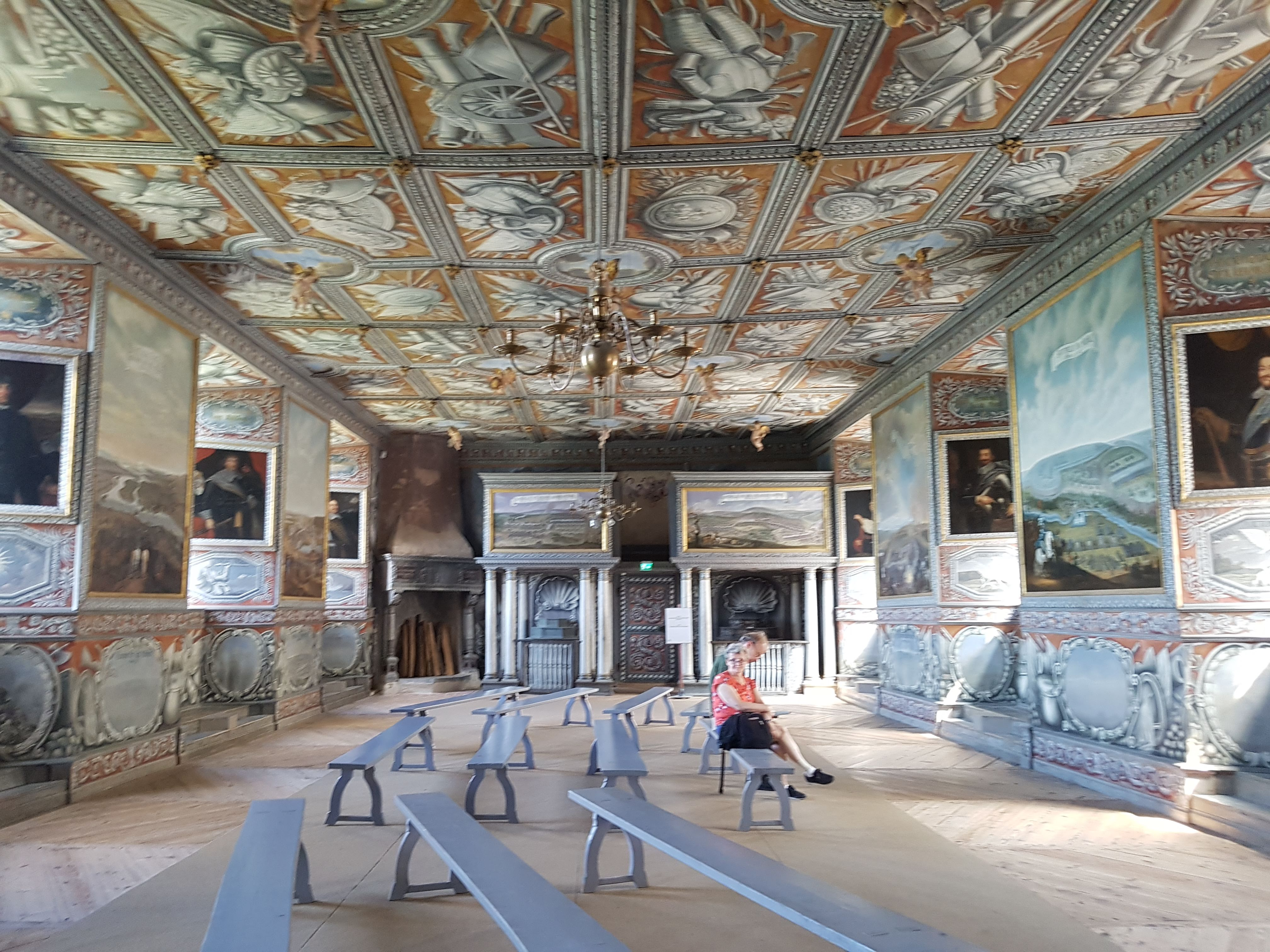
Interior of the King's Hall (Kungssalen)

The King's Hall

The hallway on the third floor

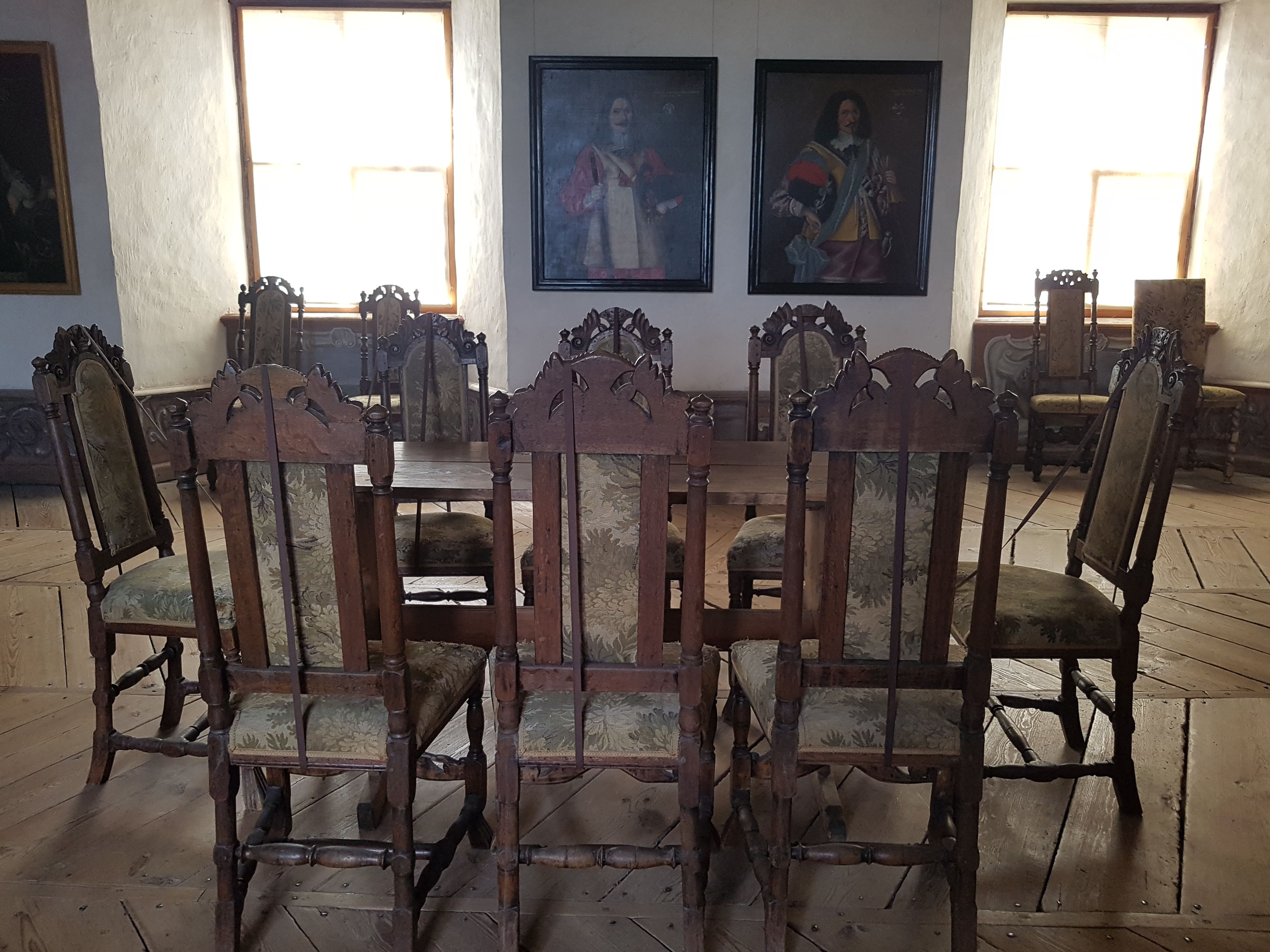
Dining room at Läckö Castle on the third floor.

The two lower storeys of the large central building were partly rebuilt during the Vasa era, while the third storey was reconstructed during the period of Jacob De la Gardie. During the tenure of his son, Magnus Gabriel De la Gardie, the outer ward, the fourth storey of the central building, the courtyard arcades, and the castle church with its imposing tower were added. The castle church was built by the master builder Frans Stiemer.

Interior of the Läckö Castle Chapel

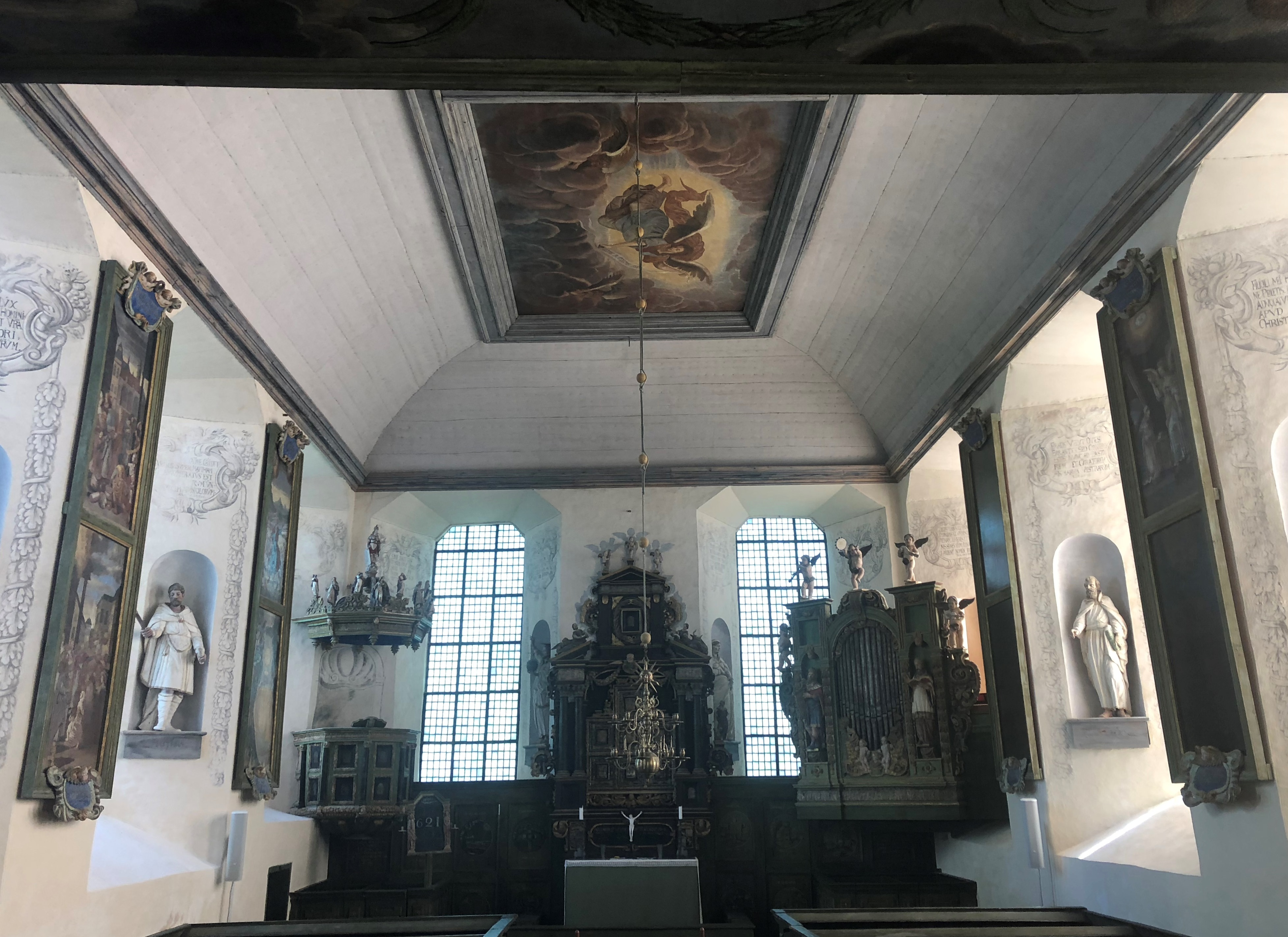

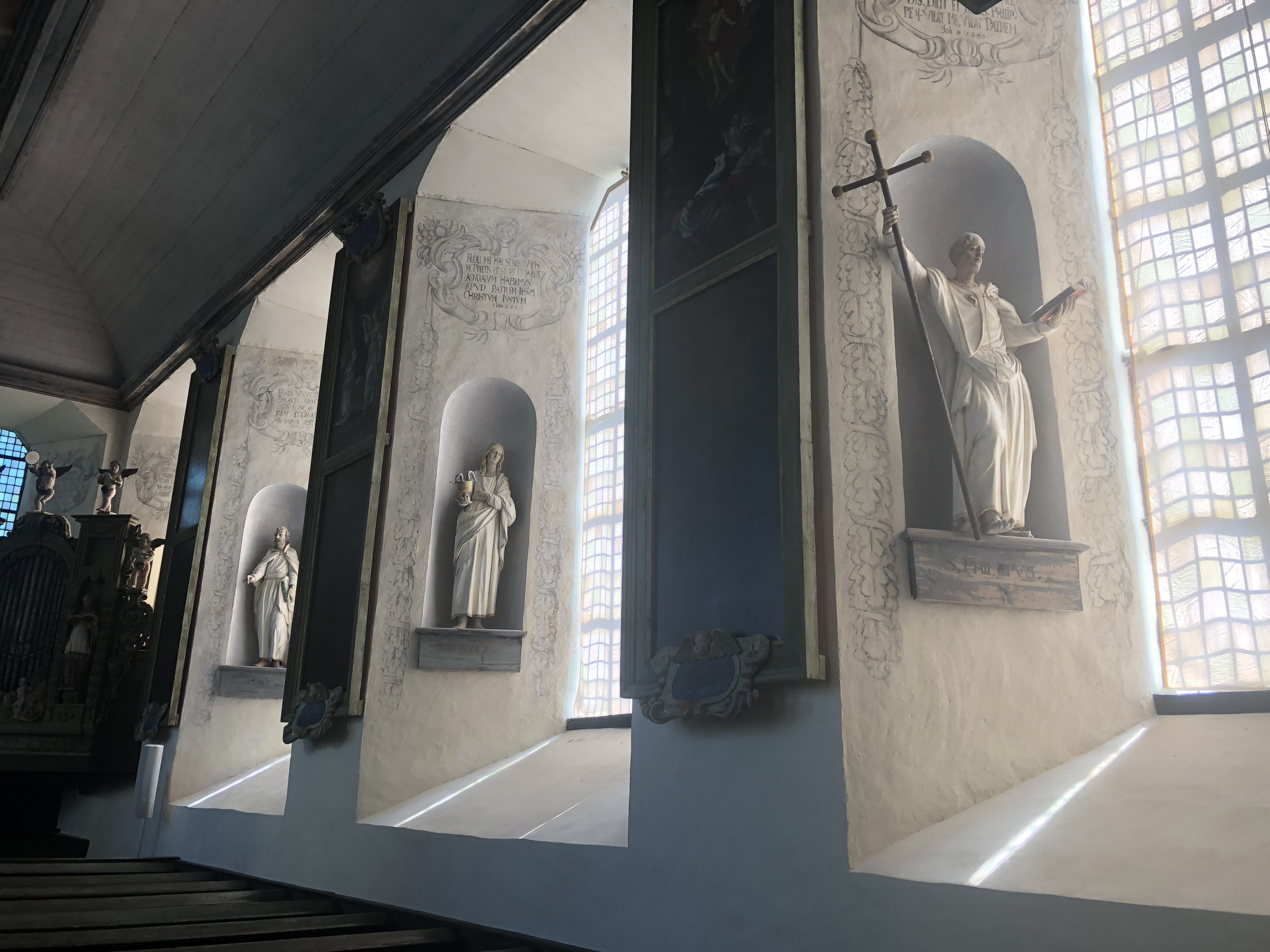

The castle, which has approximately 248 rooms, was lavishly decorated with paintings, sculptures and stucco work, including works by J. Hammer and B. Conrath, as well as expensive furniture and woven tapestries. Some of the room decorations have survived, including those in the Knights' Hall, the Old King's Chamber, the Princess's Bedchamber and the Trojan Hall. Most of the decoration was destroyed during the period of decline that followed the Great Reduction. The battle paintings from the Knights' Hall were transferred to Karlberg Palace, and in 1830 the most valuable portraits were moved to Gripsholm Castle. Some of the furnishings were also sold at auction in 1830. Conservation work began in the early 20th century under the direction of Ärland Noreen. The castle church in particular underwent extensive restoration, and some furnishings were returned to the castle.

== Other Sources ==
- The Splendour of The Baroque. Läcko Castle, A Nobleman’s Home in Sweden’s Age of Greatness (Lars Sjöberg and Anneli Welin. Stockholm: National Museum of Fine Arts. Text in Swedish. 2001) ISBN 91-7100-643-5
