= Opéra de Baugé =

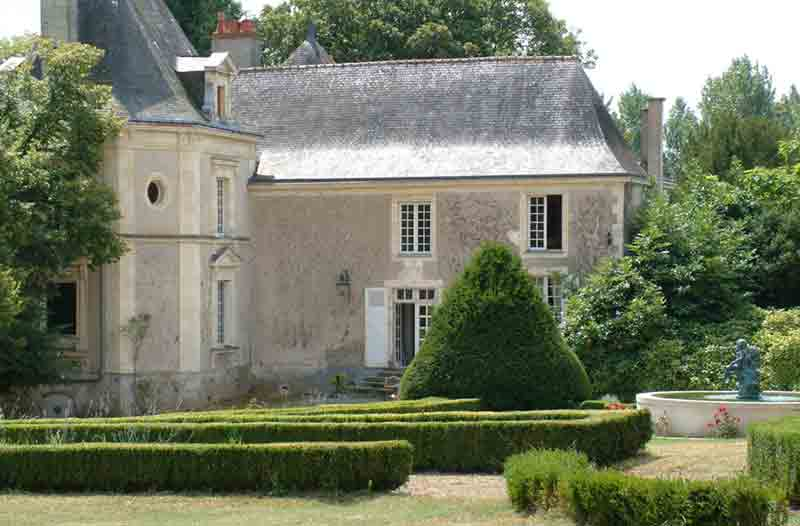
Les Capucins

Opéra de Baugé is an opera festival held each summer near the Loire town of Baugé-en-Anjou, 40 kilometres east of Angers, France.

From 2003 to 2011 the festival was held in the gardens of Les Capucins (pictured), a private house and former convent. In 2016 the festival returned to Les Capucins after 4 years in a theatre in the centre of the town.

The festival is modelled on England's Glyndebourne Festival Opera, and performances feature 90-minute intervals during which members of the audience picnic or dine in the attached restaurant. Many of the cast and orchestra are British, and the performances are surtitled in both English and French. In recent years the festival has drawn an audience of 2,500-3,000 to the town, including large numbers who travel from the UK.

The 2024 season will feature performances of Don Carlos (Verdi), Carmen (Bizet) and L'Elisir d'Amore (Donizetti).

The opera is noted for its authentic performances, with a full orchestra and chorus in support of fully staged productions. The festival has increasingly attracted talented soloists from across Europe and beyond. Singers have gone on to win prizes including the Kathleen Ferrier Award and positions in the Young Artists Programme at Covent Garden

Bernadette Grimmett has been artistic director of the festival since its inception.

== See also ==
- List of opera festivals
