= Läckö Castle Opera =

Coordinates: 58°40′30″N 13°13′12″E

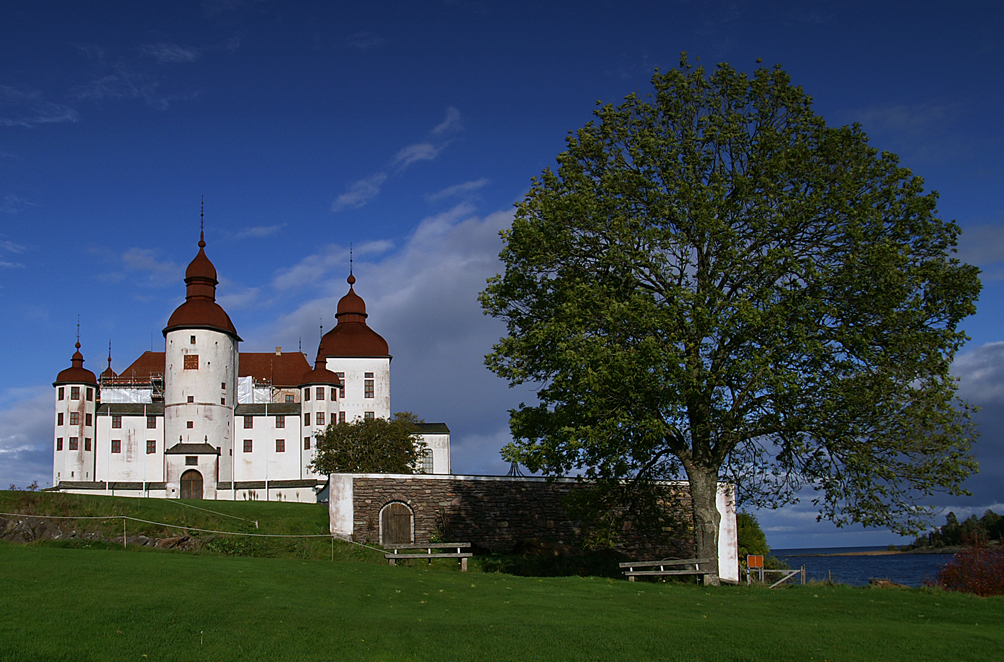
Läckö Castle, venue of the Castle Opera

Läckö Castle Opera (Swedish: Läckö Slottsopera) is a summer opera company which has staged an opera each summer since 1997. Performances take place in the inner courtyard of the baroque Läckö Castle 25 km from the city of Lidköping in Sweden, normally during three weeks of the summer starting in the middle of July.

== History ==
The Castle Opera started in 1997 as an independent project where the Foundation of Läckö Castle made the courtyard available to an external producer. The audience's positive response to the first operas led the Foundation of Läckö Castle to assume responsibility as organizers from 2001 onwards. Opera performance became a part of the Foundation's regular activities, with an aim to show the castle to the public and contribute to the Lidköping area's high quality cultural experiences.

In 2003 the Castle Opera initiated a collaboration with Musik i Väst (presently Kultur i Väst – Culture in the West) that continues to this day. Simon Phipps, the former Artistic Director of Musik i Väst, is the musical director for the opera performances at Läckö Castle Opera.

A retractable sail roof was installed in 2006 in the inner courtyard of the castle as rain protection for the audience. The total roof area is 400 m^{2} divided into four sections; two of 120 m^{2} each and two of 80 m^{2} each.

The Castle Opera received the Swedish magazine Opera's Opera Prize (Swedish: Tidskrften Operas operapris) in 2011 for its 'daring repertoire policy', the first time the Opera Prize was awarded to an institution.

== Facilities ==
The inner courtyard is the prime reason for opera being performed at Läckö Castle. The high whitewashed walls are highly irregular; no lines are straight and no angle is equal to any other angle. The result is acoustically well suited for live unamplified music and a whisper can be heard by the entire audience. The inner courtyard seats 370 to 390 spectators, depending on the size of the stage and the orchestra pit for a given production.

Since the Castle Opera is situated 25 km from the town of Lidköping, many guests choose to purchase a package that includes an opera ticket and dinner or snacks before the opera performance. Within the castle area there is a choice between the rustic Stable Café in a small outbuilding on the castle embankment, and the posh White Hart Restaurant in a modern exhibition hall 300 meters from the castle. During intermissions coffee and light snacks can be purchased in the outer courtyard, and opera spectators may enjoy the view or visit the ecological Small Castle Garden, the castle's baroque style kitchen garden with vegetables, spices and edible flowers.

== Productions ==
With the exception of the first three years 1997 to 1999, when the three well-known Mozart operas Così fan tutte, The Marriage of Figaro and Don Giovanni were staged, the repertoire has consisted of operas less often performed.

Given the size of the castle's inner courtyard, the total number of staff on and off stage (including singers, orchestra and stage hands) cannot readily exceed 50. Therefore, the management has made a virtue of necessity and chosen a repertoire with limited cast and orchestra requirements, and it has also tried to incorporate the castle's existing features into the dramas, having looked for plots that harmonize with the intimate character of the setting. The composers of choice have been Mozart, Haydn, Rossini and Britten. In 2008 the Castle Opera commissioned the drama Magnus Gabriel with music by the Swedish composer Daniel Börtz about the mid 17th century lord of the Läckö Castle Magnus Gabriel De la Gardie.

Year	Opera	Composer	Conductor	Director
1997	Così fan tutte	Wolfgang Amadeus Mozart	Sven Åke Landström	Catarina Gnosspelius
1998	The Marriage of Figaro	Wolfgang Amadeus Mozart	Sven Åke Landström	Catarina Gnosspelius
1999	Don Giovanni	Wolfgang Amadeus Mozart	Sven Åke Landström	Catarina Gnosspelius
2000	L'isola disabitata (The Desert Island)	Joseph Haydn	Miguel Ramos	Niklas Hellberg
2001	La fedeltà premiata (Fidelity Rewarded)	Joseph Haydn	Miguel Ramos	Niklas Hellberg
2002	Don Pasquale	Gaetano Donizetti	Sonny Jansson	Catarina Gnosspelius
2003	Die Entführung aus dem Serail (The Abduction from the Seraglio)	Wolfgang Amadeus Mozart	Simon Phipps	Bill Bankes-Jones
2004	L'étoile (The Horoscope)	Emmanuel Chabrier	Simon Phipps	Sven-Åke Gustavsson
2005	The Beggar's Opera	John Gay	Olof Boman	Catarina Gnosspelius
2006	La pietra del paragone (The Touchstone)	Gioachino Rossini	Simon Phipps	Stina Ancker
2007	Albert Herring	Benjamin Britten	Simon Phipps	Bernt Höglund
2008	Magnus Gabriel	Daniel Börtz	Simon Phipps	Elisabet Ljungar
2009	L'italiana in Algeri (The Italian Girl in Algiers)	Gioachino Rossini	Simon Phipps	Henry Bronett
2010	La gazza ladra (The Thieving Magpie)	Gioachino Rossini	Simon Phipps	William Relton
2011	The Turn of the Screw	Benjamin Britten	Simon Phipps	Patrik Sörling
2012	The Cunning Little Vixen	Leoš Janáček	Simon Phipps	Linda Mallik
2013	A Midsummer Night's Dream	Benjamin Britten	Simon Phipps	Åsa Melldahl
2014	Falstaff	Giuseppe Verdi	Simon Phipps	Märit Bergvall
2015	Béatrice et Bénédict	Hector Berlioz	Simon Phipps	Catarina Gnosspelius
2016	Det går an	Fjellström & Sundqvist (only family name listed on company's website)	Simon Phipps	Fellbom (only family name listed)
2017	The Turk in Italy	Giuseppe Verdi	Simon Phipps	Bethke (only family name listed)
2018	Der Vampyr	Heinrich Marschner	Simon Phipps	Schmid & Holder (only family names listed)
2019	The Marriage of Figaro	Wolfgang Amadeus Mozart	Simon Phipps	Barslev (only family name listed)
2020	Tintomara production postponed due to COVID-19			
2021	Tintomara	Werle	Simon Phipps	Ermedahl (only family name listed)

== Organization ==
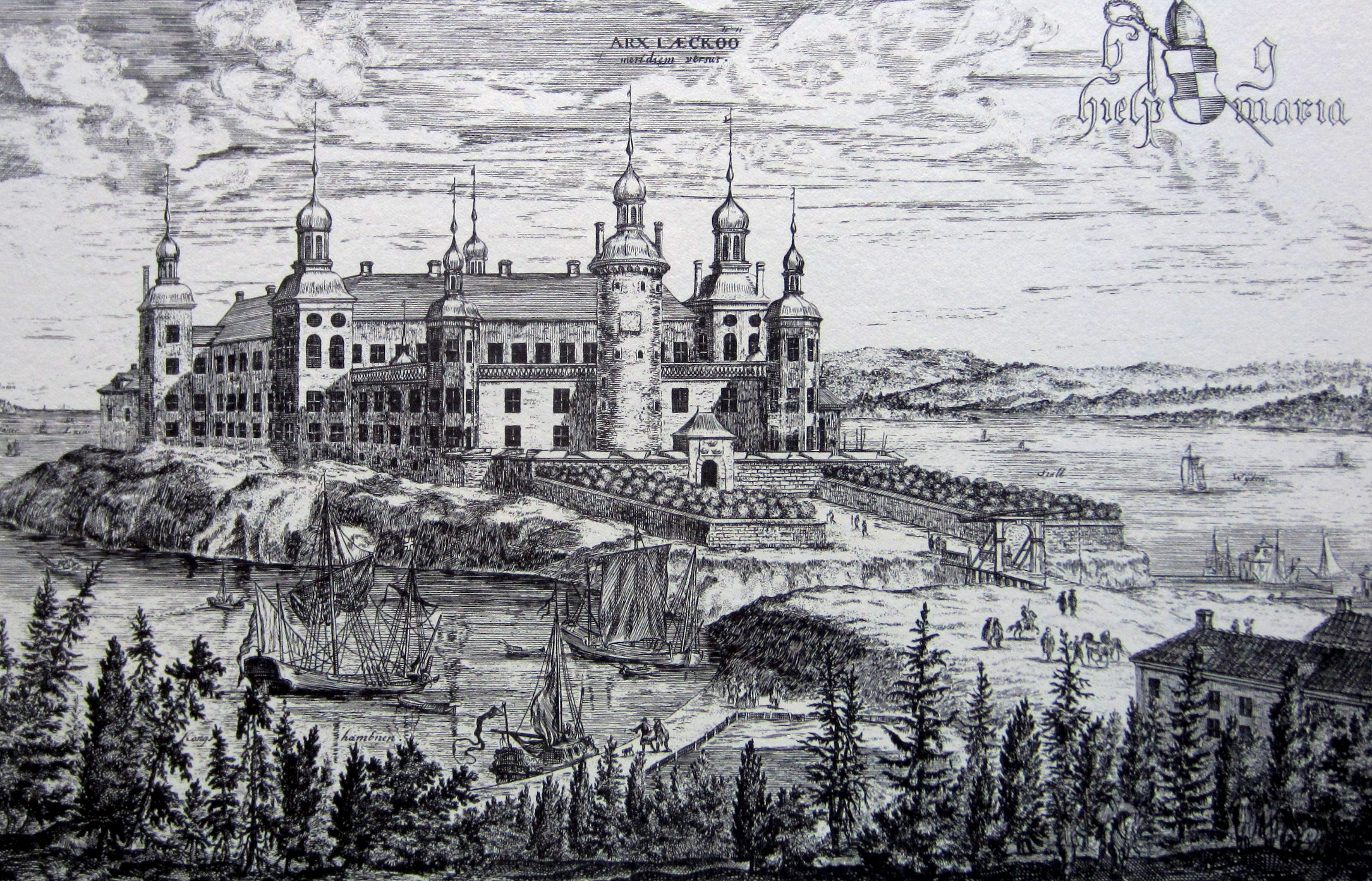
Läckö Castle in the late 1600s

Läckö Castle is a national heritage building managed by the National Property Board of Sweden.

The Castle Opera is managed by the Foundation of Läckö Castle (Swedish: Stiftelsen Läckö Slott). The Foundation's activities include exhibitions, guided tours, horticulture, outdoor activities, lectures, children's activities and cultural experiences. The Foundation was founded in 1990 by the Crafoord Foundation, the Region of Västra Götaland, the County of Lidköping, and the local bank Sparbanken Lidköping. The Castle Opera is part of the Foundation of Läckö Castle's overall mission to fill the castle with activities that enrich and enhance it as a travel destination, and to show the castle to visitors in a lively and interesting way.

Cultural activities at Läcko Castle are financially supported by the Region of Västra Götaland, the County of Lidköping, Kultur i Väst, the Grevillis Foundation and the National Property Board of Sweden, as well as the local daily newspaper Nya Lidköpings-Tidningen.
