= Albert Sottile House =

Coordinates: 32°47′03″N 79°56′18″W

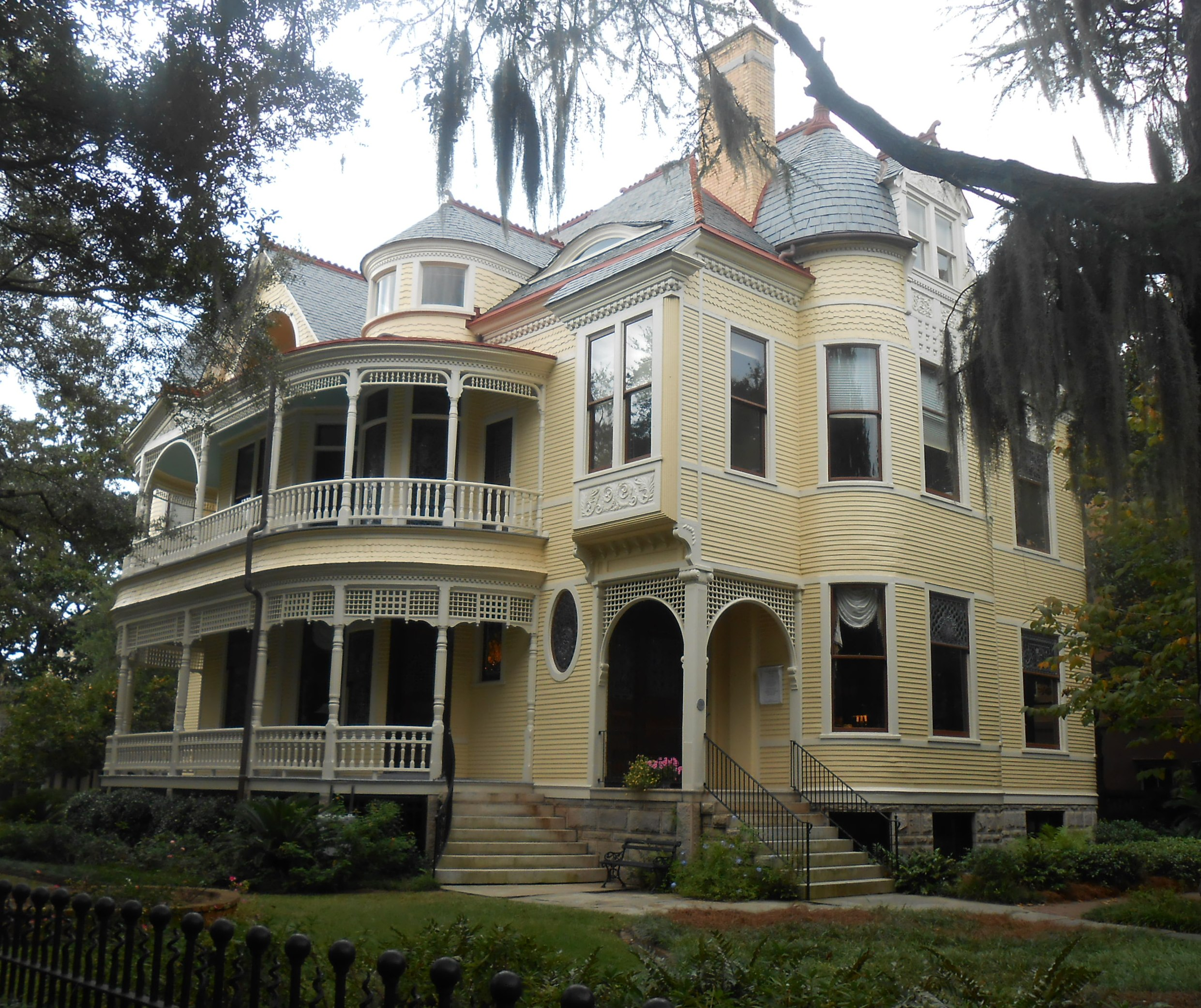

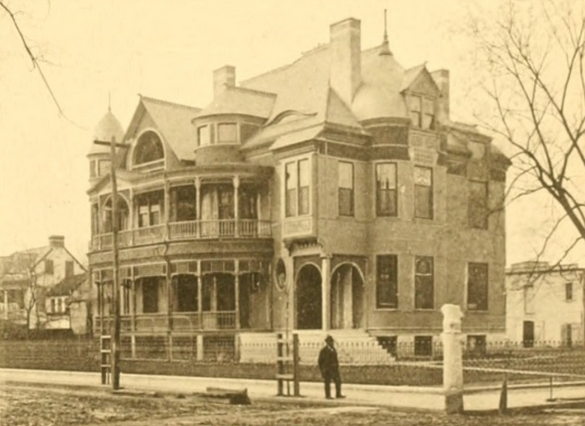
The Sottile House was photographed here in 1892, shortly after its completion.

The Albert Sottile House is a Victorian house at 11 College St., Charleston, South Carolina. The house was built by Samuel Wilson in 1890, a prominent merchant and banker. The architect of the house was S.W. Foulk of Richmond, Virginia.

After his death, the house was sold to the Sottile family in 1912. The house has been part of the College of Charleston since 1964.
