= Longborough =

Village in Gloucestershire, England

Coordinates: 51°57′N 1°44′W

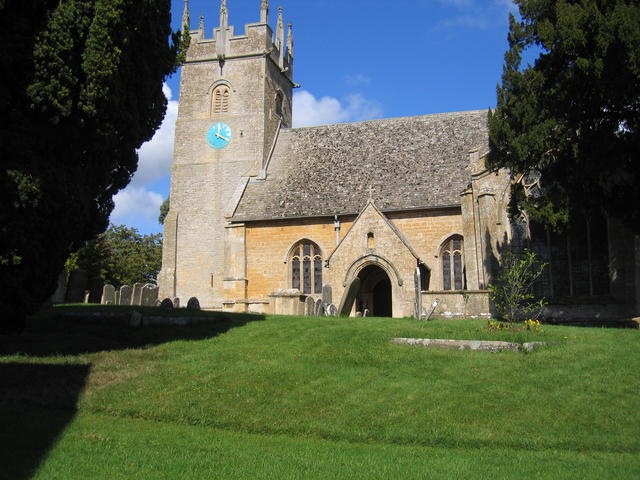
- St James' Church, Longborough

- Location within Gloucestershire
- Population: 471 (2011 Census)
- District: Cotswold
- Shire county: Gloucestershire
- Region: South West
- Country: England
- Sovereign state: United Kingdom
- Post town: Moreton-in-Marsh
- Postcode district: GL56
- Police: Gloucestershire
- Fire: Gloucestershire
- Ambulance: South Western
- UK Parliament: North Cotswolds
- Website: Longborough Parish Council

Longborough is a village and civil parish 2.5 miles (4.0 km) north of the market town of Stow on the Wold, Gloucestershire. The parish population taken at the 2011 census was 471.

The village is about 0.5 miles (800 m) east of the A424, around 1.5 miles (2.4 km) west of the Fosse Way (A429) and is on the Heart of England Way.

Longborough has a village shop and post office; a farm shop; an opera house; two public houses, one in the village itself, and the other in the hamlet of Ganborough; a village school and the 12th-century Church of England parish church of St James.

In September 2001, Longborough was the winner of the Bledisloe Cup competition for best kept village.

Longborough hosts the Longborough Festival Opera, in a converted barn at the edge of the village.

The village falls in the Fosseridge electoral ward. This ward starts in Broadwell, passes Longborough, and ends in the northeast at Todenham. The total ward population taken at the 2011 census was 1,794.
