= College of Charleston School of Business =

American school

- Established: 1770
- President: Andrew Hsu
- Dean: Paul H. Schwager
- Administrative staff: 70
- Undergraduates: 1549
- Postgraduates: 24
- Location: Charleston, South Carolina, United States; 32°46′59″N 79°56′9″W
- Campus: Tate Center for Entrepreneurship and Beatty Center
- Website: http://sb.cofc.edu

The College of Charleston School of Business is an AACSB International accredited institution for business.

== History ==
The business program at the College of Charleston began under the leadership of the university's sixteenth president Theodore Stern. President Stern believed that business programs were an appropriate complement to the liberal arts education and a value-add for Charleston and the region.

Dr. Howard Rudd served as the first dean of the School of Business in 1984, and was charged with making it a nationally accredited school. In just four years, Dr. Rudd led the school to its international AACSB accreditation.

== Campus ==
The School of Business facilities include the Tate Center for Entrepreneurship, constructed with support by Jack Tate's donation of 1.5 million dollars, and the Beatty Center, partially funded by a multi-million dollar gift from Guy and Betty Beatty.

== Programs ==
Business school rankings

U.S. MBA Rankings
- Bloomberg (2025): 67

The School of Business offers the Bachelor of Science degrees in

- Accounting
- Business Administration
- Commercial Real Estate Finance
- Economics
- Finance
- Hospitality and Tourism Management
- International Business
- Marketing
- Supply Chain Management.

For graduate programs, the School offers a one-year, full-time Master of Business Administration degree and Master of Science in Accountancy. Minors and interdisciplinary concentrations are also available through the School of Business or any other undergraduate program within the university.
