= College of Charleston =

Public college in Charleston, South Carolina, US

Coordinates: 32°47′3″N 79°56′17″W

- Motto: Sapientia Ipsa Libertas (Latin); Ædes Mores Juraque Curat (Latin)
- Motto in English: "Wisdom Itself is Liberty" "She Cares for Her Temples, Customs and Rights"
- Type: Public university
- Established: 1770; 256 years ago
- Accreditation: SACS
- Academic affiliations: ORAU; Sea-grant; Space-grant
- Endowment: $157.1 million (2025)
- President: Andrew Hsu
- Administrative staff: 899
- Students: 11,926 (fall 2024)
- Undergraduates: 10,880 (fall 2024)
- Postgraduates: 1,046 (fall 2024)
- Location: Charleston, South Carolina, United States
- Campus: 80 acres (0.32 km^{2}); Midsize city
- Newspaper: The College Today
- Colors: Maroon and white
- Nickname: Cougars
- Sporting affiliations: NCAA Division I – CAA; Sun Belt; NCEA; SAISA
- Mascot: Cougar
- Website: charleston.edu
- College of Charleston
- U.S. National Register of Historic Places
- U.S. National Historic Landmark
- Location: Glebe, George, St. Philip and Green streets, Charleston, South Carolina
- Area: 4 acres (1.6 ha)
- Built: 1827
- Architects: Edward B. White; George E. Walker
- Architectural style: Early Republic
- NRHP reference No.: 71000748

Significant dates
- Added to NRHP: November 11, 1971
- Designated NHL: November 11, 1971

The College of Charleston (CofC or Charleston) is a public comprehensive university in Charleston, South Carolina, United States. Founded in 1770 and chartered in 1785, it is the oldest university in South Carolina, the 13th-oldest institution of higher learning in the United States, and the country's oldest municipal college.

The founders of the College of Charleston included six Founding Fathers of the United States, including three who signed the Declaration of Independence (Thomas Heyward Jr., Arthur Middleton, and Edward Rutledge) and three who signed the Constitution of the United States (Charles Pinckney, Charles Cotesworth Pinckney, and John Rutledge).

== History ==
The College of Charleston was founded in 1770, making it the 13th-oldest institution of higher education and oldest municipal college in the nation. The college's original structure, located at the site of what is now Randolph Hall, was designed similar to a barracks. In March 1785, the South Carolina General Assembly issued a charter to the college, which officially opened in 1790 and hosted its first commencement in 1794. The first president of the college was Robert Smith, who served in the position from 1790 to 1797.

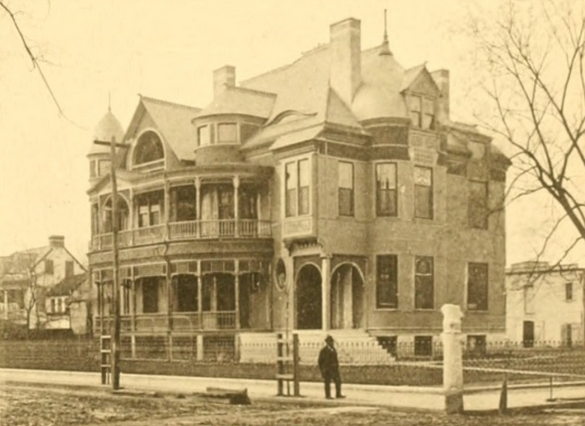
Sottile House in 1892

A second charter was issued by the general assembly in 1791 stipulating that the college would not discriminate on the basis of religion. During the Antebellum era, further development efforts in the college resulted in the construction of Randolph Hall and the President's House, both of which were built using slave labor. In 1837, the Charleston municipal government assumed control over the college.

During the mid-20th century, several African Americans attempted to apply to the racially segregated college as part of the Double V campaign against racism in the United States, but they were all rejected.

Though the college became a private institution in 1949 to avoid being racially integrated during the civil rights movement, black students were admitted starting in 1967 as a result of external pressure.

== Academics ==
Academic rankings

Master's
- Washington Monthly: 302

Regional
- U.S. News & World Report: 8

National
- Forbes: 294
- WSJ/College Pulse: 501–600

The College of Charleston consists of eight academic schools, as well as the Honors College and the Graduate School.

- School of the Arts
- School of Business
- School of Education
- School of Engineering, Computing, and Mathematics
- School of Health Sciences
- School of Humanities and Social Sciences
- School of Languages, Cultures, and World Affairs
- School of Natural and Environmental Sciences
- Honors College
- Graduate School

=== Bully Pulpit Series ===
The Bully Pulpit Series is hosted jointly by the College of Charleston's School of Humanities & Social Sciences, Departments of Political Science and Communication. The series welcomes U.S. presidential candidates from the two major political parties to the campus.

In the 2020 presidential campaign, the series hosted Michael Bennet, Joe Biden, Cory Booker, Pete Buttigieg, Julian Castro, John Delaney, Tulsi Gabbard, Amy Klobuchar, Beto O'Rourke, Bernie Sanders, Elizabeth Warren, and Andrew Yang.

=== Piccolo Spoleto Young Artist Series ===
Part of Charleston's annual Piccolo Spoleto Festival (May/June), our Piccolo Spoleto Young Artists Series features emerging artists in the area. These advanced College of Charleston students perform concerts ranging from classical and jazz ensembles to voice recitals and a new steel band.

=== Civility Initiative ===
The Civility Initiative at the College of Charleston is a program that sponsors public events focused on civic discourse and engagement. Activities include speaker events, panel discussions, and workshops. The initiative is directed by Mike Lee, who also hosts the podcast When We Disagree.

In 2025, the initiative hosted a panel discussion titled Finding Common Ground in a Divided World featuring Bakari Sellers and Trey Gowdy. The event was subsequently featured in a segment on PBS NewsHour.

=== Life Design ===
Life Design is a student development program at the College of Charleston. The program offers coaching, workshops, and other resources related to academic and career planning. The Life Design Lab is housed in the School of Business.

== Campus ==
The College of Charleston's main campus in downtown Charleston, South Carolina, includes 156 buildings, a mix of modern and historic buildings built between 1770 and 2015. The average building is over 100 years old, and 20 buildings are under historic, protective easements. The College of Charleston downtown campus is listed on the National Register of Historic Places, as is William Blacklock House.

Outside of downtown Charleston, the campus includes the Grice Marine Lab on James Island, the J. Stewart Walker Sailing Center and the Patriots Point Athletic Complex in Mount Pleasant and the 881-acre (357 ha) Stono Preserve.

The College of Charleston was named "America's Most Beautiful College Campus" by Travel + Leisure in 2017, a title it also held in 2019 as Country Living magazine's "Most Beautiful Campus" in the South.

The Mace Brown Museum of Natural History is a public natural history museum located on the campus. The collection's focus is on the paleontology of North American mammals, and specifically the South Carolina Lowcountry. The museum has more than 30,000 vertebrate and invertebrate fossils.

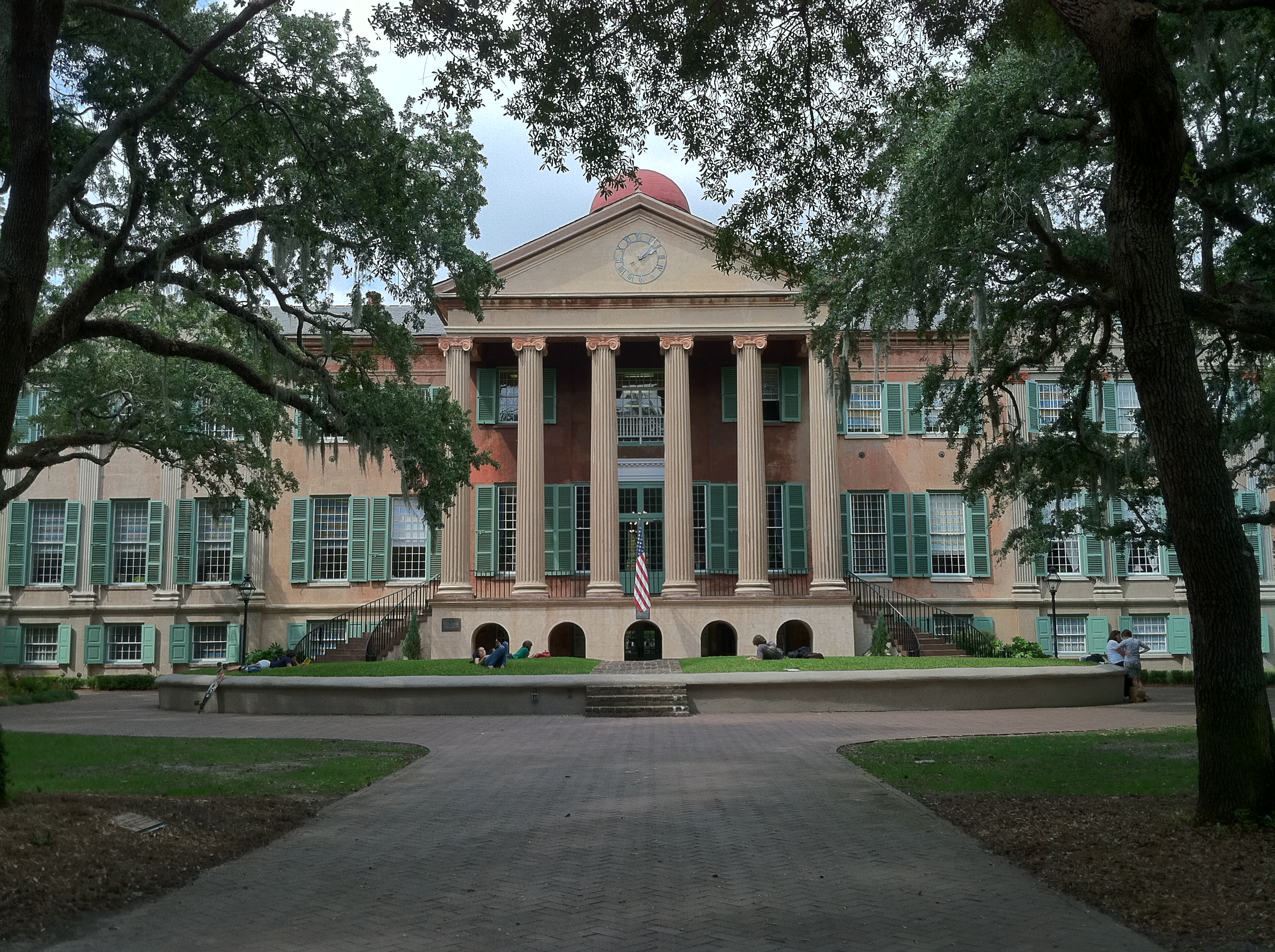
Randolph Hall, the college's oldest building

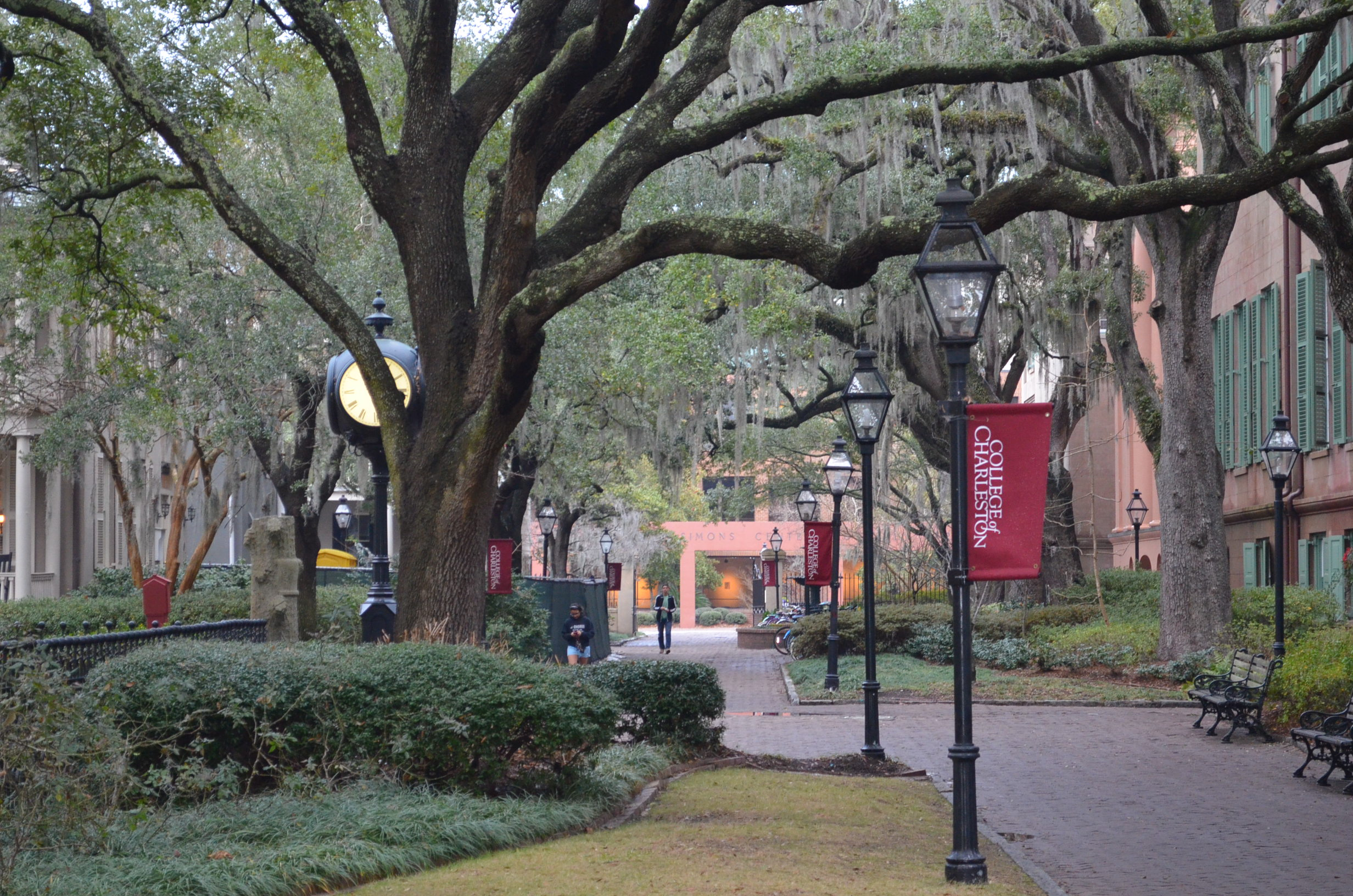
College of Charleston campus

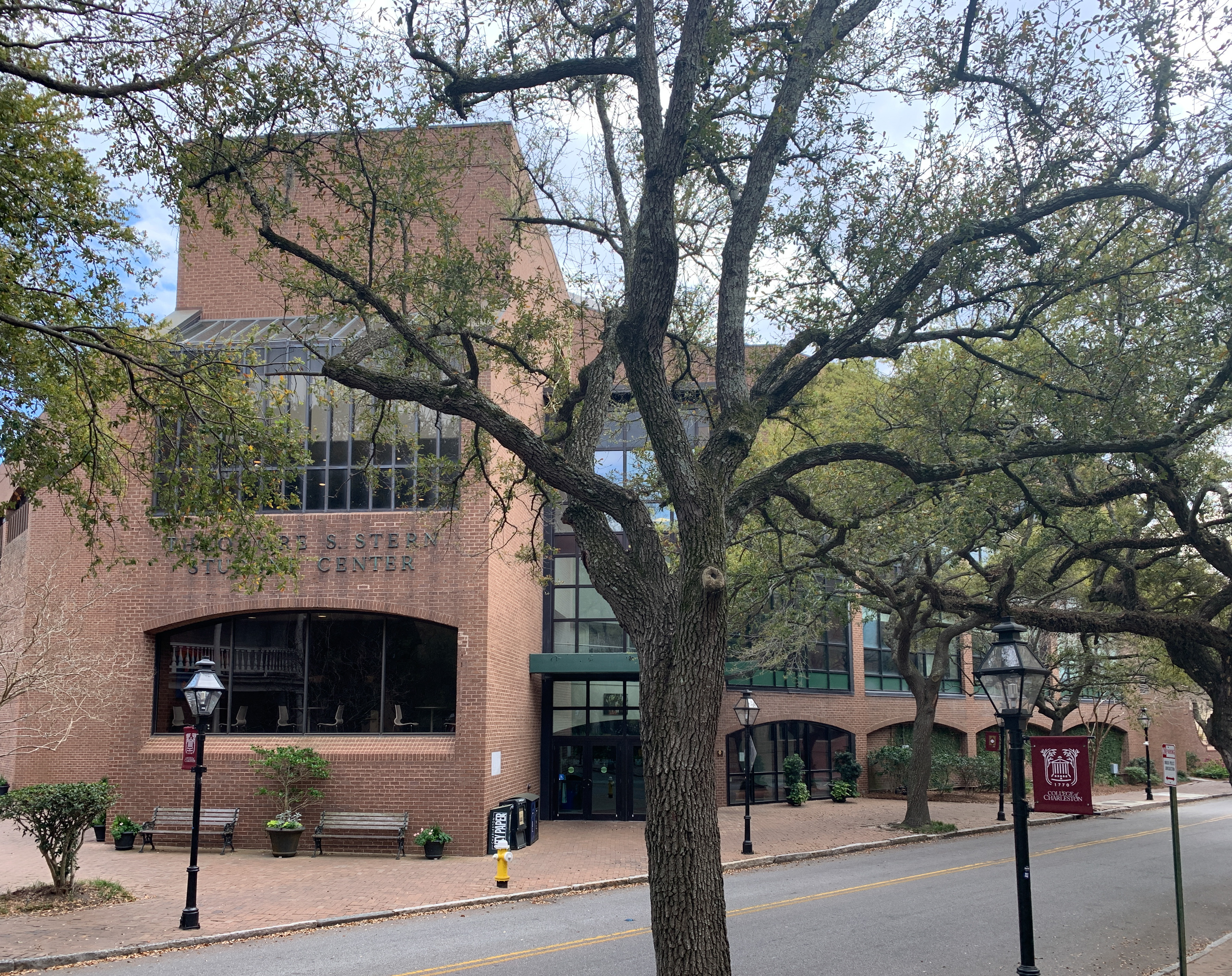
Stern Center

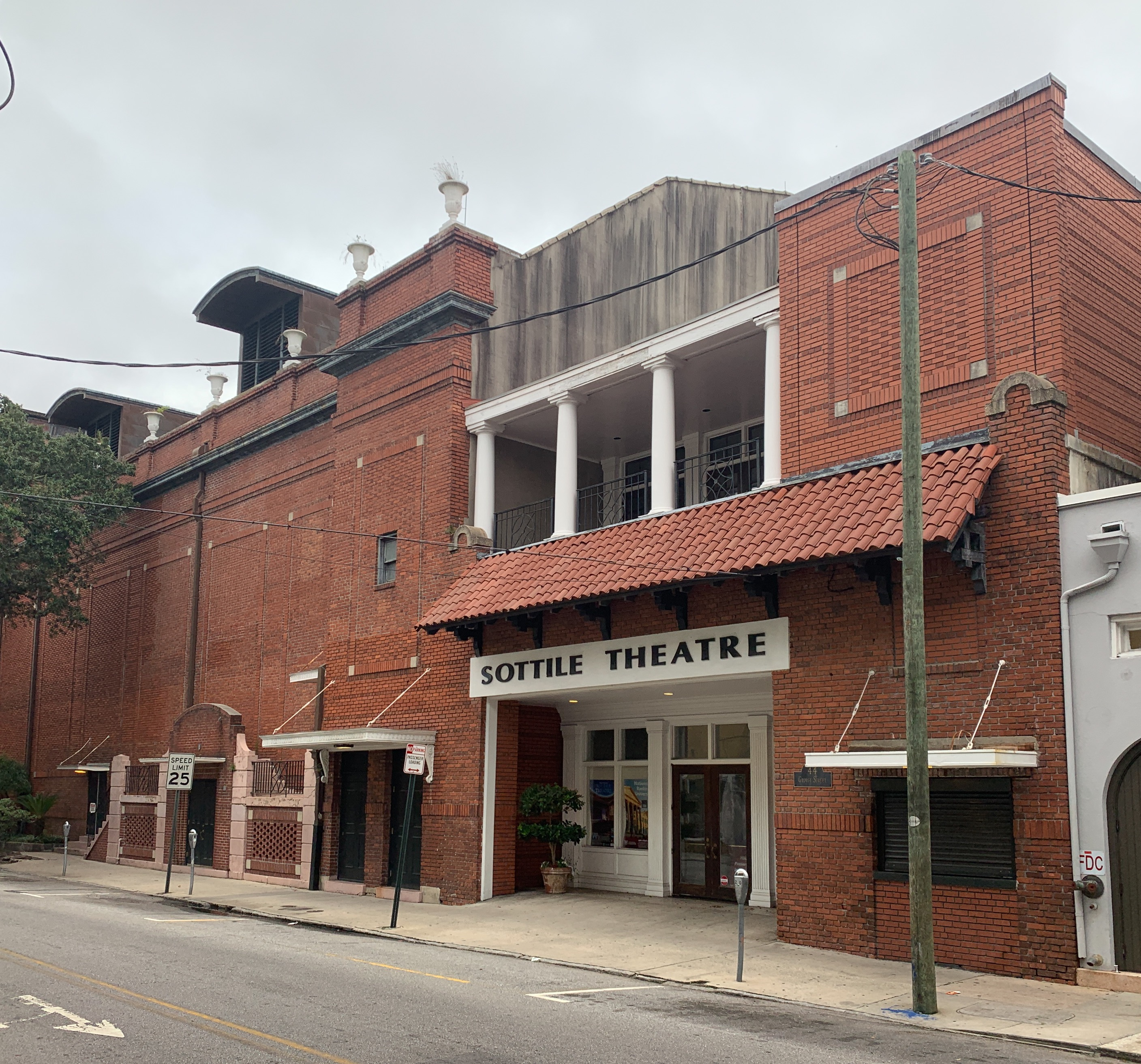
Sottile Theatre

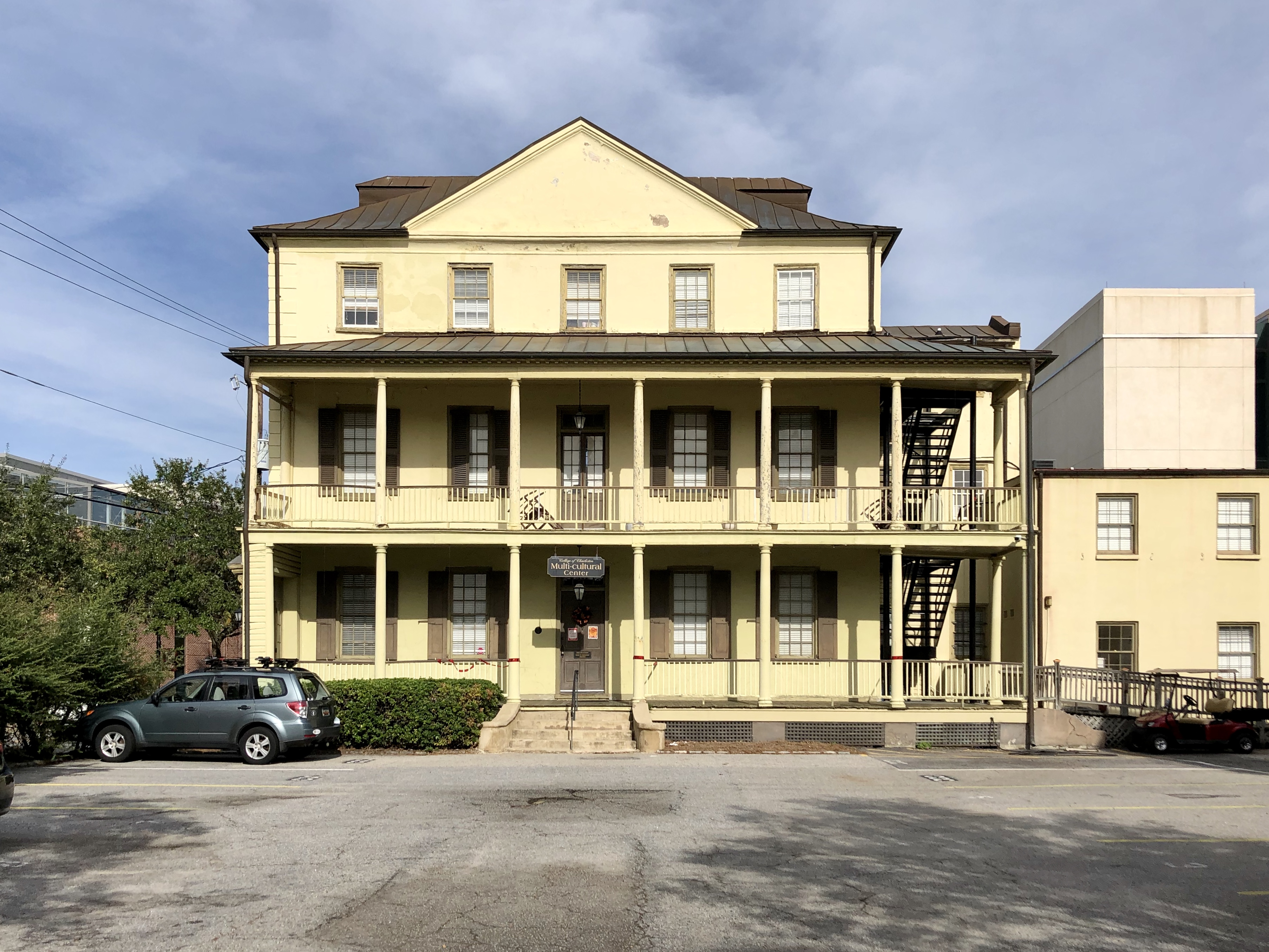
Multi-Cultural Center

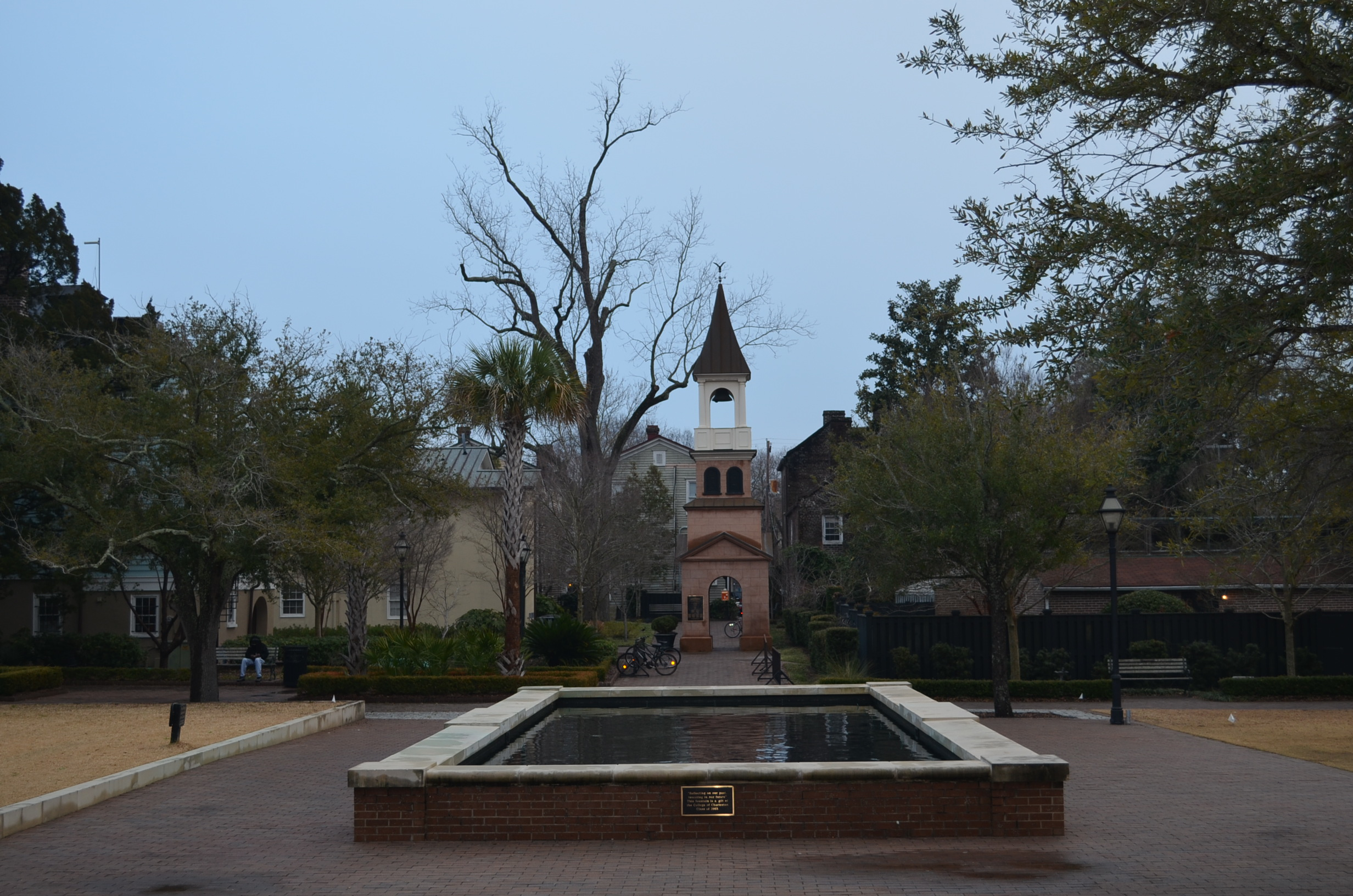
Campus

== Athletics ==
The institution's 19 varsity sports teams participate in the NCAA Division I Coastal Athletic Association and are known as the Cougars. The Cougars compete at a variety of athletics facilities in the Charleston area, including the TD Arena, the J. Stewart Walker Sailing Complex, Johnson Center Squash Courts, Patriots Point Athletic Complex, White Horses, LLC and the Links at Stono Ferry.

College of Charleston athletics are supported by the College of Charleston Athletic Fund, which was established in 1974. During the 1970–71 school year, College of Charleston students voted to change the nickname from the Maroons to the Cougars, in honor of a cougar that had recently arrived at the Charles Towne Landing Animal Forest. Clyde the Cougar is the current mascot.

The men's basketball team is ranked No. 6 for the highest winning percentage in NCAA Division I men's college basketball history.

== Student life ==
Undergraduate demographics as of Fall 2023
| Race and ethnicity | Total |
|---|---|
| White | 78% |
| Hispanic | 7% |
| Black | 5% |
| Two or more races | 4% |
| Asian | 2% |
| Unknown | 2% |
| International student | 1% |
Economic diversity
| Low-income (Note: The percentage of students who received an income-based federal Pell grant intended for low-income students.) | 21% |
| Affluent (Note: The percentage of students who are a part of the American middle class at the bare minimum.) | 79% |

Greek life has been active on campus for 120 years. Currently, the college has 8 Panhellenic, 8 IFC and 8 NPHC fraternities and sororities.
