= Ian McKellen on screen and stage =

Filmography and theatrography

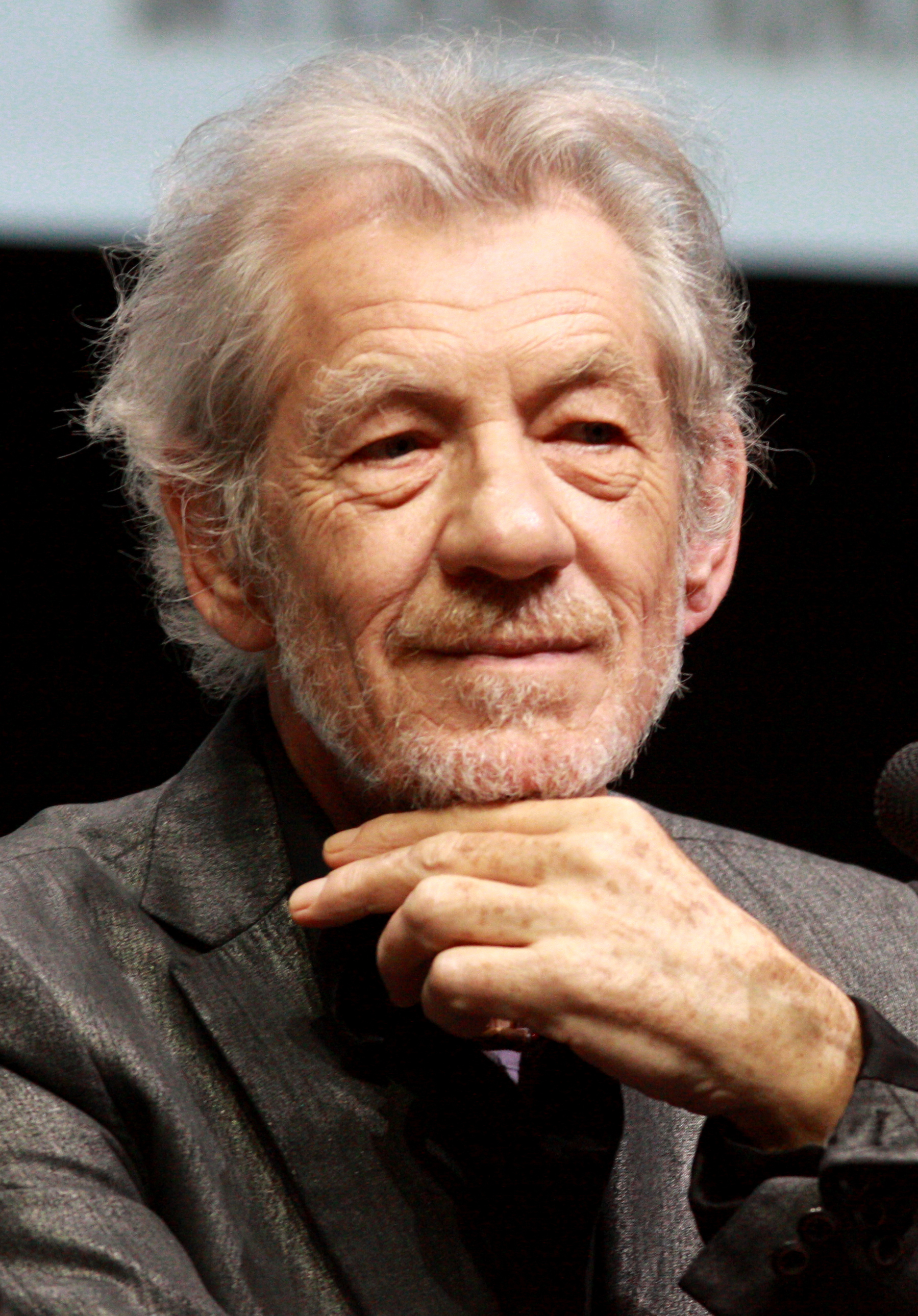
McKellen in 2013

Sir Ian McKellen is an English actor. Known for his work on stage and screen, he is the recipient of seven Laurence Olivier Awards, a Tony Award, a Golden Globe Award, two Academy Award nominations, four BAFTA nominations and five Emmy Award nominations. McKellen's work spans genres ranging from Shakespearean and modern theatre to popular fantasy and science fiction. His notable film roles include Gandalf in The Lord of the Rings and The Hobbit trilogies, Erik Lehnsherr / Magneto in the X-Men films, Sir Leigh Teabing in The Da Vinci Code (2006), Sherlock Holmes in Mr. Holmes (2015) and Cogsworth in the live action adaptation of Beauty and the Beast (2017).

== Performances by medium ==
Key
†	Denotes films that have not yet been released

=== Film ===
Year	Title	Role	Director	Notes
1969	Alfred the Great	Roger	Clive Donner	
1969	A Touch of Love	George Matthews	Waris Hussein	
1969	The Promise	Leonidik	Michael Hayes	
1981	Priest of Love	D. H. Lawrence	Christopher Miles	
1983	The Keep	Dr. Theodore Cuza	Michael Mann	
1985	Plenty	Sir Andrew Charleson	Fred Schepisi	
1985	Zina	Arthur Kronfeld	Ken McMullen	
1989	Scandal	John Profumo	Michael Caton-Jones	
1993	Six Degrees of Separation	Geoffrey Miller	Fred Schepisi	
1993	The Ballad of Little Jo	Percy Corcoran	Maggie Greenwald	
1993	Last Action Hero	Death	John McTiernan	
1994	To Die For	Quilt Documentary Narrator	Peter Litten	Voice role
1994	The Shadow	Dr. Reinhardt Lane	Russell Mulcahy	
1994	I'll Do Anything	John Earl McAlpine	James L. Brooks	
1995	Restoration	Will Gates	Michael Hoffman	
1995	Richard III	Richard III	Richard Loncraine	Also writer and executive producer
1995	Jack and Sarah	William	Tim Sullivan	
1997	Swept from the Sea	Dr. James Kennedy	Beeban Kidron	
1997	Bent	Uncle Freddie	Sean Mathias	
1998	Gods and Monsters	James Whale	Bill Condon	
1998	Apt Pupil	Kurt Dussander	Bryan Singer	
2000	X-Men	Erik Lehnsherr / Magneto	Bryan Singer	
2001	The Lord of the Rings: The Fellowship of the Ring	Gandalf the Grey	Peter Jackson	
2002	The Lord of the Rings: The Two Towers	Gandalf the White	Peter Jackson	
2003	X2	Erik Lehnsherr / Magneto	Bryan Singer	
2003	Emile	Emile	Carl Bessai	
2003	The Lord of the Rings: The Return of the King	Gandalf the White	Peter Jackson	
2004	Eighteen	Older Jason Anders	Richard Bell	Voice role
2005	Neverwas	Gabriel Finch	Joshua Michael Stern	
2005	Asylum	Dr. Peter Cleave	David Mackenzie	
2005	The Magic Roundabout	Zebedee	Dave Borthwick, Jean Duval, and Frank Passingham	Voice role
2006	Flushed Away	The Toad	David Bowers and Sam Fell	Voice role
2006	The Da Vinci Code	Sir Leigh Teabing	Ron Howard	
2006	X-Men: The Last Stand	Erik Lehnsherr / Magneto	Brett Ratner	
2007	Stardust	Narrator	Matthew Vaughn	Voice role
2007	The Golden Compass	Iorek Byrnison	Chris Weitz	Voice role
2012	The Hobbit: An Unexpected Journey	Gandalf the Grey	Peter Jackson	
2013	The Wolverine	Erik Lehnsherr / Magneto	James Mangold	Cameo; mid-credits scene
2013	The Hobbit: The Desolation of Smaug	Gandalf the Grey	Peter Jackson	
2014	Miss in Her Teens	The Prologue	Matthew Butler Hart	
2014	X-Men: Days of Future Past	Erik Lehnsherr / Magneto	Bryan Singer	Shared role with Michael Fassbender
2014	The Hobbit: The Battle of the Five Armies	Gandalf the Grey	Peter Jackson	
2015	Mr. Holmes	Sherlock Holmes	Bill Condon	
2017	Beauty and the Beast	Cogsworth	Bill Condon	also voice
2017	Animal Crackers	Horatio P. Huntington	Scott Christian Sava and Tony Bancroft	Voice role
2018	All Is True	Earl of Southampton	Kenneth Branagh	
2019	The Good Liar	Roy Courtnay	Bill Condon	
2019	Cats	Gus the Theatre Cat	Tom Hooper	
2021	Infinitum: Subject Unknown	Dr. Charles Marland-White	Matthew Butler-Hart	
2022	Hamlet Within	The Ghost	Ken McMullen	
2023	The One Note Man	Storyteller	George Siougas	Voice role; short film
2023	The Critic	Jimmy Erskine	Anand Tucker	
2024	Hamlet	Hamlet	Sean Mathias	
2024	Dragfox	Gingersnap the Fox	Lisa Ott	Voice role; short film
2025	The Christophers	Julian Sklar	Steven Soderbergh	
2026	Frank and Percy	Percy	Sean Mathias	
2026	Ebenezer	Jacob Marley	Ti West	
2026	Avengers: Doomsday †	Erik Lehnsherr / Magneto (Earth-10005)	Anthony Russo and Joseph Russo	Post-production
2027	The Lord of the Rings: The Hunt for Gollum †	Gandalf the Grey	Andy Serkis	Filming

=== Theatre ===
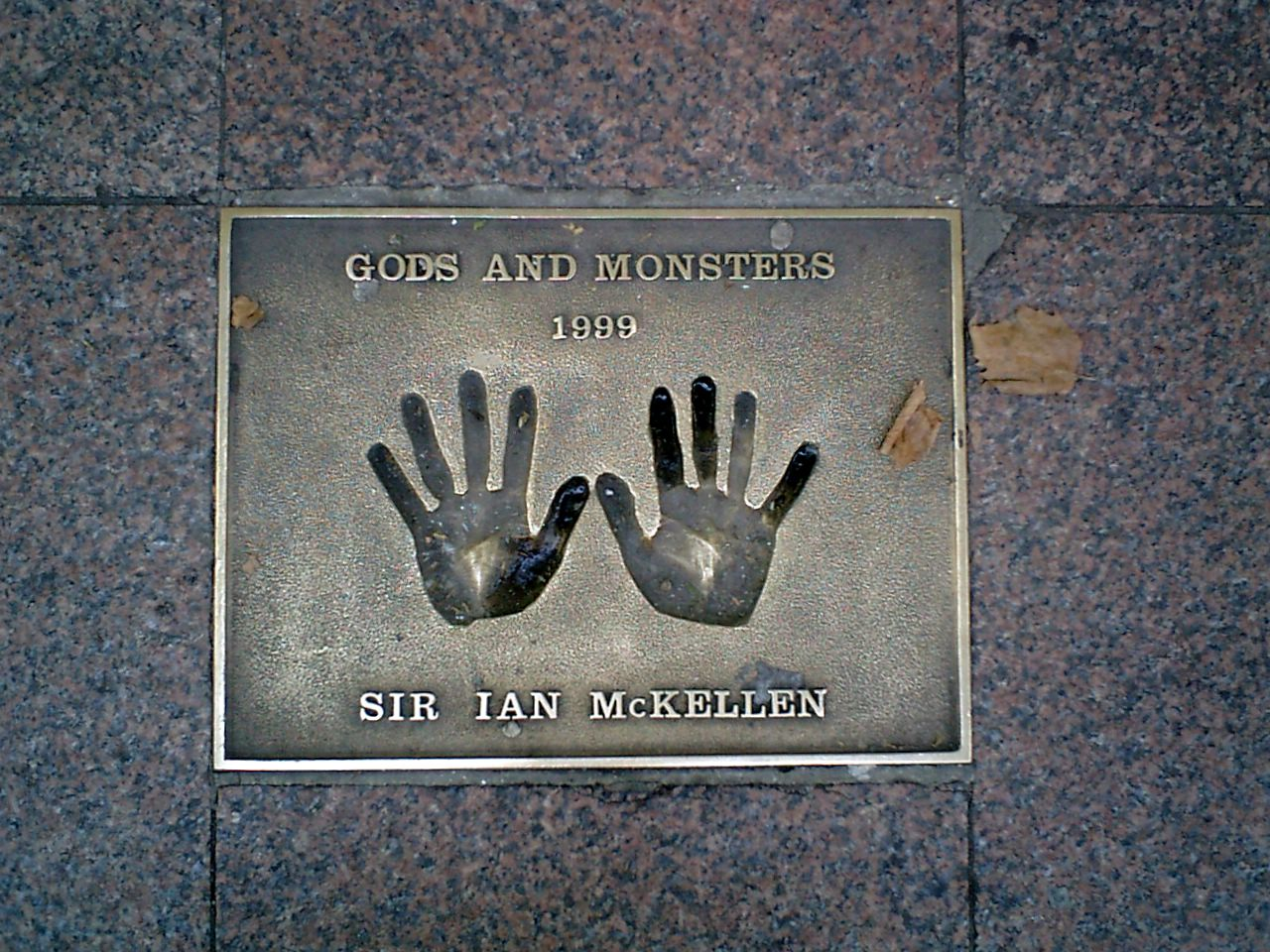
The hands of McKellen on a 1999 Gods and Monsters plaque in London's Leicester Square.

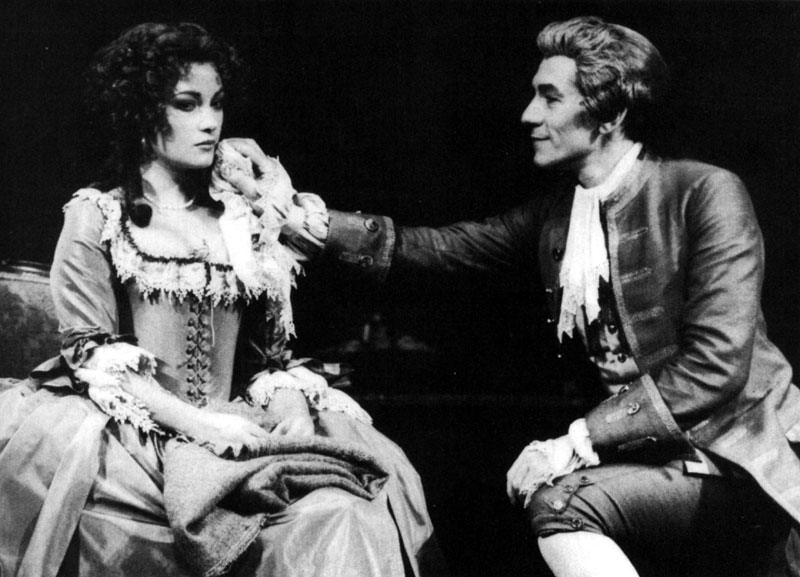
McKellen (Antonio Salieri) alongside Jane Seymour (Constanze Mozart) in Amadeus, c. 1981

Year	Title	Role	Director	Venue
1964	Sir Thomas More	Thomas More	Frank Dunlop	Nottingham Playhouse
1964	A Scent of Flowers	Godrey		Duke of York's Theatre
1965	Much Ado About Nothing	Claudio		National Theatre - The Old Vic
1965	Armstrong's Last Goodnight	Protestant Evangelist		National Theatre - Chichester Festival Theatre
1965	Trelawny of the 'Wells'	Capt. de Foenix		National Theatre - Chichester Festival Theatre
1966	The Man of Destiny / O'Flaherty V.C.	Corporal Napoleon / Private O'Flaherty		Mermaid Theatre
1966	A Lily in Little India	Alvin Hanker		Hampstead Theatre
1966	Their Very Own and Golden City	Andrew Cobham		Mermaid Theatre
1967	The Promise	Leonidik		Fortune Theatre and Henry Miller's Theatre
1968	The White Liars / Black Comedy	Tom / Harold Gorringe		Lyric Theatre
1968–1970	Richard II	Richard II		UK tour
1969	The Bacchae	Pentheus		Liverpool Playhouse
1969	The Prime of Miss Jean Brodie	—N/a		Director; Liverpool Playhouse
1969	Three Months Gone	—N/a		Director; Liverpool Playhouse
1969–1970	Edward II	Edward II		UK and European tours
1970	Billy's Last Stand	Darkly		Royal Court Theatre
1970	The Recruiting Officer	Captain Plume		UK tour
1970	Chips with Everything	Corporal Hill		UK tour
1971	Hamlet	Prince Hamlet		UK and European tours
1971	The Swan Song	Svetlovidov		Crucible Theatre
1972	The Real Inspector Hound	—N/a		Director; Phoenix Theatre
1972	The Erpingham Camp	—N/a		Director; Watford Palace Theatre
1972	Ruling the Roost / Tis Pity She's a Whore / The Three Arrows	Page-boy / Giovanni / Prince Yoremitsu		UK tour
1973	A Private Matter	—N/a		Director; Vaudeville Theatre
1973–1974	The Way of the World / The Wood Demon / King Lear	Lady Wishfort's Footman / Kruschov / Edgar		UK tour; Brooklyn Academy of Music
1974	Tis Pity She's a Whore	Giovanni		Wimbledon Theatre
1974	Dr Faustus	Dr. Faustus		Edinburgh Festival and Aldwych Theatre
1974	The Marquis of Keith	The Marquis of Keith		Aldwych Theatre
1975	King John	King John		Aldwych Theatre
1975	The Clandestine Marriage	—N/a		Director; Savoy Theatre
1975	Ashes	Colin		The Young Vic
1975	Too True to Be Good	Aubrey "Popsy" Bagot		Aldwych Theatre
1976–1977	Romeo and Juliet	Romeo	Trevor Nunn	Royal Shakespeare Theatre, Aldwych Theatre, Theatre Royal, Newcastle
1976	The Winter's Tale	King Leontes	John Barton, Barry Kyle, and Trevor Nunn	Royal Shakespeare Theatre
1976–1978	Macbeth	Macbeth	Trevor Nunn	The Other Place, The Young Vic, and Warehouse
1977–1978	The Alchemist	Face	Trevor Nunn	Royal Shakespeare Theatre and Aldwych Theatre
1977	Every Good Boy Deserves Favour	Alexander	Trevor Nunn	Barbican Arts Centre
1977	Pillars of the Community	Karsten Bernick	John Barton	Aldwych Theatre
1977	The Days of the Commune	Langevin	Howard Davies	Aldwych Theatre
1978	A Miserable and Lonely Death	Kentridge	Walter Donohue	Aldwych Theatre
1978–1979	Twelfth Night / Three Sisters	Sir Toby Belch / Andrei	John Amiel / Trevor Nunn	Also producer; UK tour
1979	Bent	Max	Robert Chetwyn	Royal Court Theatre and Criterion Theatre
1980–1990	Acting Shakespeare	Himself		World tours
1980–1981	Amadeus	Salieri	Peter Hall	Broadhurst Theatre
1982	Every Good Boy Deserves Favour	Alexander	Trevor Nunn	Barbican Arts Centre
1983	Short List	Terry	Mike Ockrent	Hampstead Theatre
1983	Cowardice	Boy	Anthony Page	Ambassadors Theatre
1984	Venice Preserv'd	Pierre	Peter Gill	Royal National Theatre
1984	Wild Honey	Michael Platonov	Christopher Morahan	Royal National Theatre
1984	Coriolanus	Gaius Marcius Coriolanus	Peter Hall	Royal National Theatre
1985	The Duchess of Malfi	Bosola	Philip Prowse	Royal National Theatre
1985	The Real Inspector Hound / The Critic	Inspector Hound / Mr. Puff	Tom Stoppard / Sheila Hancock	Royal National Theatre
1985	The Cherry Orchard	Yermolai Lopakhin	Mike Alfreds	Royal National Theatre
1986–1987	Wild Honey	Michael Platonov	Christopher Morahan	Virginia Theatre
1988	Before the Act	Performer and Producer		Piccadilly Theatre
1988–1989	Henceforward ...	Jerome	Alan Ayckbourn	Vaudeville Theatre
1989	Othello	Iago	Trevor Nunn	The Other Place and The Young Vic
1990–1992	Richard III	Richard III	Richard Eyre	Royal National Theatre and World tour
1992	Uncle Vanya	Uncle Vanya	Sean Mathias	Royal National Theatre
1993–1997	A Knight Out	Himself		UK and US tours
1997–1998	An Enemy of the People	Dr. Tomas Stockmann	Trevor Nunn	Royal National Theatre and Ahmanson Theatre
1997	Peter Pan	Mr. Darling/Captain Hook	John Caird	Royal National Theatre
1998	Present Laughter	Garry Essendine	Malcolm Sutherland	West Yorkshire Playhouse
1999	The Tempest	Prospero	Jude Kelly	West Yorkshire Playhouse
2001–2004	Dance of Death	Edgar	Sean Mathias	Broadhurst Theatre, Lyric Theatre, and Sydney Arts Festival
2004, 2005	Aladdin	Widow Twankie	Sean Mathias	The Old Vic
2006	The Cut	Max	Michael Grandage	Donmar Warehouse
2007–2008	King Lear	Lear	Trevor Nunn	Stratford-upon-Avon, Brooklyn Academy of Music, and New London Theatre
2007–2008	The Seagull	Sorin	Trevor Nunn	Stratford-upon-Avon, Brooklyn Academy of Music, and New London Theatre
2009–2010	Waiting for Godot	Estragon	Sean Mathias	Theatre Royal Haymarket, Comedy Theatre, Melbourne, and Fugard Theatre, Cape Town
2011	The Syndicate	Don Antonio	Sean Mathias	Chichester Festival Theatre
2013	No Man's Land	Spooner	Sean Mathias	Berkeley Repertory Theatre
2013–2014	Waiting for Godot / No Man's Land	Estragon / Spooner	Sean Mathias	Cort Theatre
2016	No Man's Land	Spooner	Sean Mathias	Wyndham's Theatre
2016–2019	The Exorcist	Demon (voice)	Sean Mathias	Birmingham Repertory Theatre and Phoenix Theatre; UK tour
2017	Shakespeare, Tolkien, Others and You	Himself	Jez Bond	Park Theatre
2017–2018	King Lear	Lear	Jonathan Munby	Chichester Festival Theatre and Duke of York's Theatre
2019–2020	Ian McKellen on Stage	Himself	Sean Mathias	UK tour; Harold Pinter Theatre and Hudson Theatre
2021	Hamlet	Prince Hamlet	Sean Mathias	Theatre Royal, Windsor
2021	The Cherry Orchard	Firs	Sean Mathias	Theatre Royal, Windsor
2022	Hamlet with Ian McKellen	Performer	Peter Schaufuss	Edinburgh Festival Fringe
2022–2023	Mother Goose	Mother Goose	Cal McCrystal	Duke of York's Theatre; UK tour
2023	Frank and Percy	Percy	Sean Mathias	Theatre Royal, Windsor, Theatre Royal, Bath, and The Other Palace
2024	Player Kings	John Falstaff	Robert Icke	Noël Coward Theatre
2025	Inside No. 9 Stage/Fright	Guest star (one-night only)	Simon Evans	Wyndham's Theatre
2025	Twelfth Night	Opening	Phoebe Kemp	The Space
2026	King Lear	Lear		The Yard Theatre

=== Television ===
Year	Title	Role	Notes
1964	The Indian Tales of Rudyard Kipling	Plowden	Episode: "The Tomb of His Ancestors"
1965	Sunday Out of Season	Victor Leech	Television film
1965	The Wednesday Play	Wolf	Episode: "The Trial and Torture of Sir John Rampayne"
1966	David Copperfield	David Copperfield	9 episodes
1970	Solo	John Keats	Episode: "Ian McKellen as John Keats"
1972	Country Matters	David Masterman	Episode: "Craven Arms"
1978	Jackanory	Reader	5 episodes reading "The Moon in the Cloud"
1979	Macbeth	Macbeth	Television film
1980	Armchair Thriller	Anthony Skipling	4-episode story: "Dying Day"
1981	Pillar of Fire	Narrator	Documentary
1982	The Scarlet Pimpernel	Paul Chauvelin	Television film
1982	Walter	Walter	Television film
1983	Walter and June	Walter	Television film
1988	Windmills of the Gods	Chairman	2 episodes
1989	Countdown to War	Adolf Hitler	Television film
1990	Othello	Iago	Television film
1993	Tales of the City	Archibald Anson Gidde	Miniseries, episodes 3 and 5
1993	And The Band Played On	Bill Kraus	Television film
1995	Cold Comfort Farm	Amos Starkadder	Television film
1996	Rasputin: Dark Servant of Destiny	Tsar Nicholas II	Television film
1999	David Copperfield	Mr. Creakle	2 episodes
2002	Saturday Night Live	Himself (host)	Episode: "Ian McKellen/Kylie Minogue"
2003	The Simpsons	Himself	Voice; Episode: "The Regina Monologues"
2005	Coronation Street	Mel Hutchwright/Lionel Hipkiss	10 episodes
2006	Extras	Himself	Episode: "Sir Ian McKellen"
2008	King Lear	King Lear	Television film
2009	The Prisoner	Number Two	6 episodes
2012	Doctor Who	The Great Intelligence	Voice; Episode: "The Snowmen"
2013–2016	Vicious	Freddie Thornhill	14 episodes
2015	The Dresser	Norman	Television film
2018	Family Guy	Dr. Cecil Pritchfield	Voice; Episode: "Send in Stewie, Please"
2024	Ted	Narrator	2 episodes

=== Radio ===
Year	Title	Role
1967	The First St Joan	The Dauphin
1971	Desert Island Discs	Castaway
2006	Sir Gawain and the Green Knight	Narrator

=== Video games ===
Year	Title	Role	Notes
2002	The Lord of the Rings: The Two Towers	Gandalf	Voice
2003	The Lord of the Rings: The Return of the King	Gandalf	Voice
2004	The Lord of the Rings: The Third Age	Gandalf	Voice
2004	The Lord of the Rings: The Battle for Middle-earth	Gandalf	Voice

=== Music videos ===
Year	Artist	Song
1988	Pet Shop Boys	"Heart"
2008	Guillemots	"Falling Out of Reach"
2014	George Ezra	"Listen to the Man"
2026	Troye Sivan	"Party"

==== Other musical appearances ====
- In 1987, McKellen appeared reciting Shakespeare while rock group The Fleshtones improvised behind him on Andy Warhol's Fifteen Minutes which ran on MTV.
- Appears on the 2010 Scissor Sisters track "Invisible Light" from the album Night Work, reciting a narrative passage.

=== Audiobooks ===
- Audiobook narrator of Michelle Paver's series Wolf Brother, Spirit Walker, Soul Eater, Outcast, Oath Breaker, and Ghost Hunter, as well as a version of Homer's Odyssey.

== See also ==
- List of awards and nominations received by Ian McKellen

== Sources ==
- Barratt, Mark (2005). Ian McKellen: An Unofficial Biography. London: Virgin Books. ISBN 978-0-7535-1074-2.
