= List of awards and nominations received by Ian McKellen =

Sir Ian McKellen awards and nominations
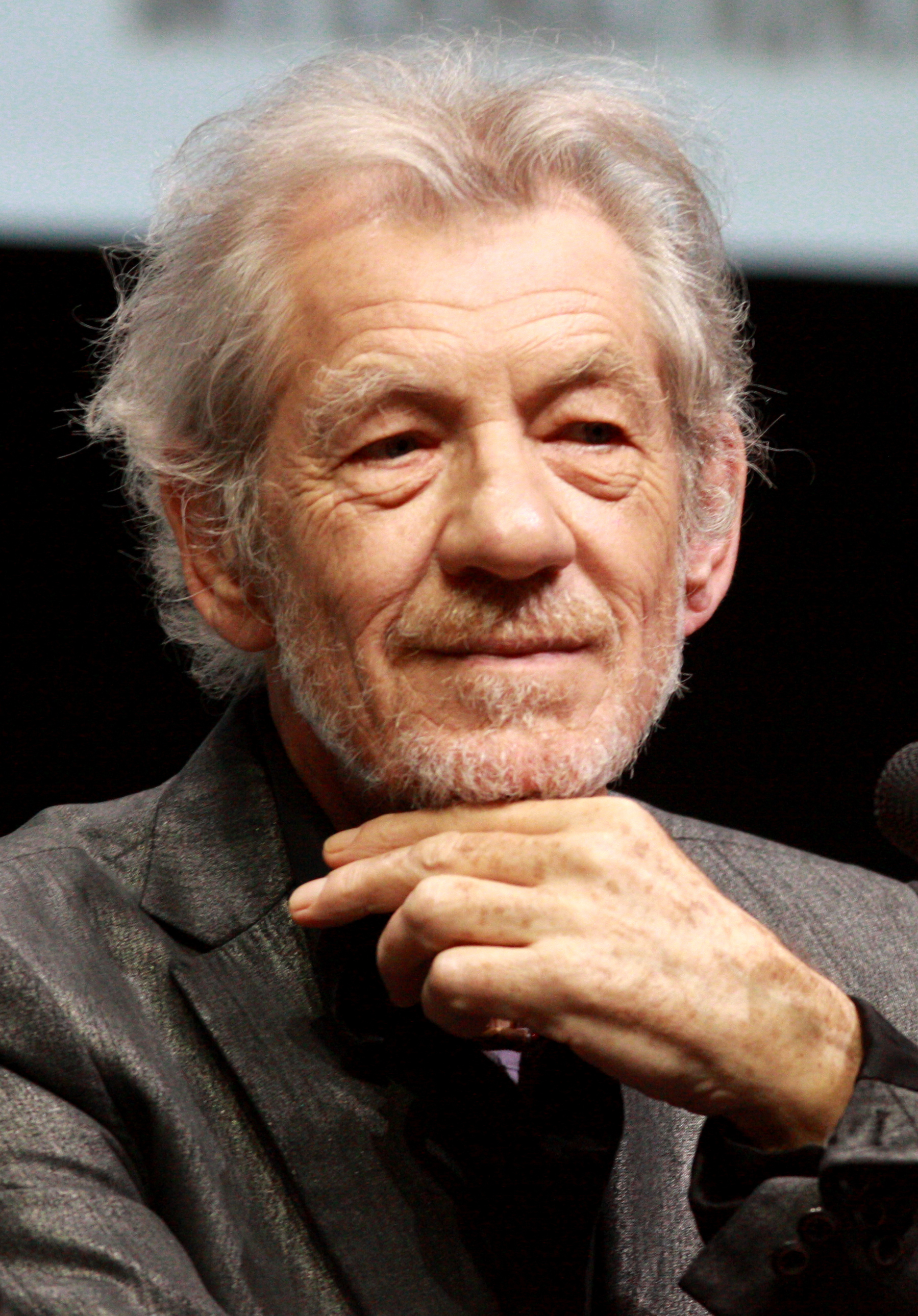
- McKellen in 2013
Awards and nominations
Award	Wins	Nominations
Academy Awards	0	2
British Academy Film Awards	0	5
Golden Globe Awards	1	3
Primetime Emmy Awards	0	5
Screen Actors Guild Awards	2	5
Olivier Award	6	12
Tony Awards	1	2

Totals (Note: Certain award groups do not simply award one winner. They acknowledge several different recipients, have runners-up, and have third place. Since this is a specific recognition and is different from losing an award, runner-up mentions are considered wins in this award tally. For simplification and to avoid errors, each award in this list has been presumed to have had a prior nomination.)
- Wins: 31
- Nominations: 64

This article is a List of awards and nominations received by Sir Ian McKellen.

Sir Ian McKellen is an English actor. Over his distinguished career on stage and screen, he has received numerous accolades including a Tony Award, six Laurence Olivier Awards, two Critics' Choice Awards, a Golden Globe Award, and two Screen Actors Guild Awards as well as nominations for two Academy Awards, five Primetime Emmy Awards, four British Academy Film Awards, and a British Academy Television Awards.

McKellen received two Academy Award nominations, his first for Best Actor for his portrayal as James Whale in the period drama Gods and Monsters (1998) with his second nomination being for Best Supporting Actor for his performance as Gandalf the Grey in Peter Jackson's fantasy epic Lord of the Rings: The Fellowship of the Ring (2001). He received nominations for the BAFTA Award for Best Actor in a Leading Role for playing King Richard III in the period drama Richard III (1995) as well as the Best Adapted Screenplay for the later. For his role as Gandalf in The Lord of the Rings trilogy (2001–2003), he was nominated for two BAFTA Awards and four Screen Actors Guild Awards including a win for Best Supporting Actor.

For his work on television, he won the Golden Globe Award as well as a nomination for the Primetime Emmy Award for Best Supporting Actor in a Miniseries or Movie for his portrayal of Tsar Nicholas II in the HBO film Rasputin: Dark Servant of Destiny (1996). He was Emmy-nominated for his roles in gay rights activist Bill Kraus in the HBO film And the Band Played On (1993), a fictionalized version of himself in the HBO comedy series Extras (2006), the title role in the PBS film King Lear (2008), and Number 2 / Curtis in AMC miniseries The Prisoner (2009). He was nominated for the British Academy Television Award for Best Supporting Actor for playing a theatrical dresser in the Starz movie The Dresser (2015).

On stage, McKellen has received two Tony Award nominations winning for Best Leading Actor in a Play for his portrayal of Antonio Salieri in the Broadway production of Amadeus in 1981. He was Tony-nominated for Best Leading Actor in a Play for Acting Shakespeare (1984). For his work on the West End stage in London, he received twelve Laurence Olivier Awards nominations, winning six times for his performances in Henrik Ibsen's The Pillars of Society (1977), Ben Jonson's The Alchemist (1978), Martin Sherman's Bent (1979), Michael Frayn's Wild Honey (1984), and William Shakespeare's Richard III (1991).

== Major awards ==
=== Academy Awards ===
Year	Category	Nominated work	Result	Ref.
1999	Best Actor	Gods and Monsters	Nominated	
2002	Best Supporting Actor	The Lord of the Rings: The Fellowship of the Ring	Nominated	

=== Actor Awards ===
Year	Category	Nominated work	Result	Ref.
1999	Outstanding Male Actor in a Leading Role	Gods and Monsters	Nominated	
2002	Outstanding Male Actor in a Supporting Role	The Lord of the Rings: The Fellowship of the Ring	Won	
2002	Outstanding Cast in a Motion Picture	The Lord of the Rings: The Fellowship of the Ring	Nominated	
2003	Outstanding Cast in a Motion Picture	The Lord of the Rings: The Two Towers	Nominated	
2004	Outstanding Cast in a Motion Picture	The Lord of the Rings: The Return of the King	Won	

=== BAFTA Awards ===
Year	Category	Nominated work	Result	Ref.
BAFTA Film Awards
1997	Best Adapted Screenplay	Richard III	Nominated	
1997	Best Actor in a Leading Role	Richard III	Nominated	
2002	Best Actor in a Leading Role	The Lord of the Rings: The Fellowship of the Ring	Nominated	
2004	Best Actor in a Supporting Role	The Lord of the Rings: The Return of the King	Nominated	
BAFTA TV Awards
2016	Best Actor in a Supporting Role	The Dresser	Nominated	

=== Emmy Awards ===
Year	Category	Nominated work	Result	Ref.
Primetime Emmy Awards
1994	Outstanding Supporting Actor in a Miniseries or a Movie	And the Band Played On	Nominated	
1996	Outstanding Supporting Actor in a Miniseries or a Movie	Rasputin: Dark Servant of Destiny	Nominated	
2007	Outstanding Guest Actor in a Comedy Series	Extras	Nominated	
2009	Outstanding Lead Actor in a Miniseries or a Movie	King Lear	Nominated	
2010	Outstanding Lead Actor in a Miniseries or a Movie	The Prisoner	Nominated	

=== Golden Globe Awards ===
Year	Category	Nominated work	Result	Ref.
1996	Best Actor – Motion Picture Drama	Richard III	Nominated	
1997	Best Supporting Actor – Television	Rasputin: Dark Servant of Destiny	Won	
1999	Best Actor – Motion Picture Drama	Gods and Monsters	Nominated	

=== Laurence Olivier Awards ===
Year	Category	Nominated work	Result	Ref.
1977	Actor of the Year in a Revival	Pillars of the Community	Won	
1978	Comedy Performance of the Year	The Alchemist	Won	
1979	Actor of the Year in a New Play	Bent	Won	
1984	Actor of the Year in a Revival	Wild Honey	Won	
1986	Best Actor in a Leading Role	The Cherry Orchard	Nominated	
1990	Best Actor in a Leading Role	Othello and Bent	Nominated	
1991	Best Actor in a Leading Role	Richard III	Won	
1992	Best Actor in a Leading Role	Uncle Vanya	Nominated	
2008	Best Actor in a Leading Role	King Lear	Nominated	
2017	Best Actor in a Leading Role	No Man's Land	Nominated	
2019	Best Actor in a Leading Role	King Lear	Nominated	

=== Tony Awards ===
Year	Category	Nominated work	Result	Ref.
1981	Best Actor in a Leading Role in a Play	Amadeus	Won	
1984	Best Actor in a Leading Role in a Play	Acting Shakespeare	Nominated	

== Other theatre awards ==
Organizations	Year	Category	Work	Result	Ref.
Drama Desk Awards	1974	Outstanding Performance	The Wood Demon / King Lear	Won	
Drama Desk Awards	1981	Outstanding Actor in a Play	Amadeus	Won	
Drama Desk Awards	1984	Outstanding One-Person Show	Acting Shakespeare	Won	
Drama Desk Awards	1987	Outstanding Actor in a Play	Wild Honey	Won	
Evening Standard Theatre Awards	1984	Best Actor	Coriolanus	Won	
Evening Standard Theatre Awards	1989	Best Actor	Othello	Won	
Garland Award	1998	Outstanding Solo Performance	A Knight Out in Los Angeles	Won	

== Critics awards ==
Organizations	Year	Category	Work	Result	Ref.
Critics' Choice Movie Awards	1998	Best Actor in a Motion Picture	Gods and Monsters	Won	
Critics' Choice Movie Awards	2003	Best Cast in a Motion Picture	The Lord of the Rings: The Return of the King	Won	
Chicago Film Critics Association	1998	Best Actor	Gods and Monsters	Won	
Los Angeles Film Critics Association	1998	Best Actor	Gods and Monsters	Won	
National Board of Review	1998	Best Actor	Gods and Monsters	Won	
Toronto Film Critics Association	1998	Best Actor	Gods and Monsters	Won	
Florida Film Critics Circle	1998	Best Actor	Gods and Monsters / Apt Pupil	Won	

== Miscellaneous awards ==
Organizations	Year	Category	Work	Result	Ref.
Annie Awards	2006	Voice Acting in a Feature Production	Flushed Away	Won	
British Independent Film Award	1998	Best Actor	Gods and Monsters	Won	
CableAce Award	1993	Best Supporting Actor Miniseries/Movie	And the Band Played On	Won	
European Film Award	1995	Best Actor	Richard III	Won	
Poppy Awards	2015	Best Supporting Actor	The Hobbit: The Battle of the Five Armies	Won	
San Sebastián International Film Festival	1998	Best Actor	Gods and Monsters	Won	
Satellite Awards	1996	Best Supporting Actor - Television	Rasputin: Dark Servant of Destiny	Nominated	
Satellite Awards	1998	Best Actor Motion Picture Drama	Gods and Monsters	Nominated	
Satellite Awards	2001	Best Supporting Actor - Motion Picture	The Lord of the Rings: The Fellowship of the Ring	Nominated	
Saturn Awards	1998	Best Supporting Actor	Apt Pupil	Won	
Saturn Awards	2001	Best Supporting Actor	The Lord of the Rings: The Fellowship of the Ring	Won	
Saturn Awards	2003	Best Supporting Actor	The Lord of the Rings: The Return of the King	Nominated	
Saturn Awards	2012	Best Supporting Actor	The Hobbit: An Unexpected Journey	Nominated	
Teen Choice Awards	2003	Choice Movie Villain	X2	Nominated	
Teen Choice Awards	2006	Choice Movie Villain	X-Men: The Last Stand	Nominated	

== Honorary awards ==
Organizations	Year	Award	Result	Ref.
Pride International Film Festival	2004	Lifetime Achievement & Distinction Award	Honored	
Laurence Olivier Awards	2006	Society's Special Award	Honored	
Laurence Olivier Awards	2006	Society's Special Award	Honored	
Evening Standard Awards	2009	The Lebedev Special Award	Honored	
Empire Awards	2010	Empire Icon Award	Honored	
Istanbul International Film Festival	2017	Honorary Award	Honored	
Honorary Citizen of Christchurch	2026	Honorary citizenship	Honored	
