= 38th Tony Awards =

1984 US theatrical awards ceremony

- Date: June 3, 1984
- Location: Gershwin Theatre, New York City, New York
- Hosted by: Julie Andrews and Robert Preston
- Most wins: La Cage aux Folles (6)
- Most nominations: Sunday in the Park with George (10)

Television/radio coverage
- Network: CBS

The 38th Annual Tony Awards were held on June 3, 1984, at the Gershwin Theatre and broadcast by CBS television. Hosts were Julie Andrews and Robert Preston.

== Eligibility ==
Shows that opened on Broadway during the 1983–1984 season before May 7, 1984 are eligible.

Original plays

- Beethoven's Tenth
- Brothers
- Edmund Kean
- End of the World
- Glengarry Glen Ross
- The Golden Age
- The Guys in the Truck
- Ian McKellen Acting Shakespeare
- Noises Off
- Open Admissions
- Play Memory
- The Real Thing
- A Woman of Independent Means

Original musicals

- Amen Corner
- Baby
- Doonesbury
- The Human Comedy
- La Cage aux Folles
- Marilyn: An American Fable
- Peg
- The Rink
- Sunday in the Park with George
- The Tap Dance Kid

Play revivals

- American Buffalo
- Awake and Sing!
- The Corn Is Green
- Death of a Salesman
- The Glass Menagerie
- Heartbreak House
- A Moon for the Misbegotten

Musical revivals

- Mame
- Oliver!
- La Tragedie de Carmen
- Zorba

== The ceremony ==
Presenters and performers: Carol Channing, Marilyn Cooper, Nancy Dussault, Robert Goulet, Robert Guillaume, Dustin Hoffman, Beth Howland, Larry Kert, Michele Lee, Dorothy Loudon, Shirley MacLaine, Liza Minnelli, Mary Tyler Moore, Anita Morris, Bernadette Peters, Anthony Quinn, Tony Randall, Tony Roberts, Chita Rivera, Leslie Uggams, Gwen Verdon, Raquel Welch

Musicals represented:

- Baby ("I Want It All" - Liz Callaway, Catherine Cox and Beth Fowler)
- La Cage aux Folles ("We Are What We Are" - Company/"I Am What I Am" - George Hearn)
- The Tap Dance Kid ("Fabulous Feet" - Hinton Battle, Company)
- The Rink ("Wallflower" - Chita Rivera and Liza Minnelli)
- Sunday in the Park with George ("Sunday" - Mandy Patinkin, Bernadette Peters, Company)

There was a special salute to the songs of John Kander and Fred Ebb, Jerry Herman and Stephen Sondheim. The Finale was a medley of Jerry Herman songs, including "Milk and Honey' and "Shalom" (Robert Goulet), "Before the Parade Passes By" (Carol Channing), "It Only Takes a Moment" (Nancy Dussault), "Hello, Dolly!" (chorus plus Channing), "If He Walked Into My Life" (Leslie Uggams) and "Mame" (Dorothy Loudon); a Mack & Mabel medley with Robert Preston ("I Won't Send Roses") and Bernadette Peters ("Time Heals Everything"); and a La Cage aux Folles segment with Gene Barry, the Cagelles, and George Hearn, ("I Am What I Am"). The first Brooks Atkinson Award for lifetime contribution to the theater was given to Al Hirschfeld.

== Winners and nominees ==
Winners in bold

Best Play	Best Musical
**The Real Thing – Tom Stoppard**; Glengarry Glen Ross – David Mamet; Noises Off – Michael Frayn; Play Memory – Joanna Glass	**La Cage aux Folles**; Baby; Sunday in the Park with George; The Tap Dance Kid
Best Revival	Best Book of a Musical
**Death of a Salesman**; American Buffalo; Heartbreak House; A Moon for the Misbegotten	**Harvey Fierstein – La Cage aux Folles**; Sybille Pearson – Baby; James Lapine – Sunday in the Park with George; Charles Blackwell – The Tap Dance Kid
Best Performance by a Leading Actor in a Play	Best Performance by a Leading Actress in a Play
**Jeremy Irons – The Real Thing as Henry**; Calvin Levels – Open Admissions as Calvin Jefferson; Rex Harrison – Heartbreak House as Captain Shotover; Ian McKellen – Ian McKellen Acting Shakespeare as Performer	**Glenn Close – The Real Thing as Annie**; Rosemary Harris – Heartbreak House as Hesione Hushabye; Linda Hunt – End of the World as Audrey Wood; Kate Nelligan – A Moon for the Misbegotten as Josie Hogan
Best Performance by a Leading Actor in a Musical	Best Performance by a Leading Actress in a Musical
**George Hearn – La Cage aux Folles as Albin**; Gene Barry – La Cage aux Folles as Georges; Ron Moody – Oliver! as Fagin; Mandy Patinkin – Sunday in the Park with George as George	**Chita Rivera – The Rink as Anna**; Rhetta Hughes – Amen Corner as Sister Margaret Alexander; Liza Minnelli – The Rink as Angel; Bernadette Peters – Sunday in the Park with George as Dot/Marie
Best Performance by a Featured Actor in a Play	Best Performance by a Featured Actress in a Play
**Joe Mantegna – Glengarry Glen Ross as Richard Roma**; Robert Prosky – Glengarry Glen Ross as Shelly Levene; Philip Bosco – Heartbreak House as Boss Mangan; Douglas Seale – Noises Off as Selsdon Mowbray	**Christine Baranski – The Real Thing as Charlotte**; Jo Henderson – Play Memory as Ruth MacMillan; Dana Ivey – Heartbreak House as Lady Utterword; Deborah Rush – Noises Off as Brooke Ashton
Best Performance by a Featured Actor in a Musical	Best Performance by a Featured Actress in a Musical
**Hinton Battle – The Tap Dance Kid as Dipsey**; Samuel E. Wright – The Tap Dance Kid as William; Stephen Geoffreys – The Human Comedy as Homer; Todd Graff – Baby as Danny	**Lila Kedrova – Zorba as Madame Hortense**; Martine Allard – The Tap Dance Kid as Emma; Liz Callaway – Baby as Lizzie Fields; Dana Ivey – Sunday in the Park with George as Yvonne/Naomi Eisen
Best Original Score (Music and/or Lyrics) Written for the Theatre	Best Choreography
**La Cage aux Folles – Jerry Herman (music and lyrics)**; Baby – David Shire (music) and Richard Maltby Jr. (lyrics); The Rink – John Kander (music) and Fred Ebb (lyrics); Sunday in the Park with George – Stephen Sondheim (music and lyrics)	**Danny Daniels – The Tap Dance Kid**; Wayne Cilento – Baby; Graciela Daniele – The Rink; Scott Salmon – La Cage aux Folles
Best Direction of a Play	Best Direction of a Musical
**Mike Nichols – The Real Thing**; Michael Blakemore – Noises Off; David Leveaux – A Moon for the Misbegotten; Gregory Mosher – Glengarry Glen Ross	**Arthur Laurents – La Cage aux Folles**; James Lapine – Sunday in the Park with George; Richard Maltby, Jr. – Baby; Vivian Matalon – The Tap Dance Kid
Best Scenic Design	Best Costume Design
**Tony Straiges – Sunday in the Park with George**; Clarke Dunham – End of the World; Peter Larkin – The Rink; Tony Walton – The Real Thing	**Theoni V. Aldredge – La Cage aux Folles**; Jane Greenwood – Heartbreak House; Anthea Sylbert – The Real Thing; Patricia Zipprodt and Ann Hould-Ward – Sunday in the Park with George
Best Lighting Design
**Richard Nelson – Sunday in the Park with George**; Ken Billington – End of the World; Jules Fisher – La Cage aux Folles; Marc B. Weiss – A Moon for the Misbegotten

== Special awards ==
- To director Peter Brook and producer Alexander H. Cohen for La tragédie de Carmen, for outstanding achievement in musical theatre
- Peter Feller, a master craftsman who has devoted forty years to theatre stagecraft and magic
- A Chorus Line producer Joseph Papp was presented with a special Gold Tony Award in honor of becoming Broadway's longest-running musical
- Al Hirschfeld, Brooks Atkinson Award for Lifetime Achievement in the Theatre

Regional Theatre Award

- Old Globe Theatre, San Diego, California

=== Multiple nominations and awards ===
These productions had multiple nominations:

- 10 nominations: Sunday in the Park with George
- 9 nominations: La Cage aux Folles
- 7 nominations: Baby, The Real Thing and The Tap Dance Kid
- 6 nominations: Heartbreak House
- 5 nominations: The Rink
- 4 nominations: Glengarry Glen Ross, A Moon for the Misbegotten and Noises Off
- 3 nominations: End of the World
- 2 nominations: Play Memory

The following productions received multiple awards.

- 6 wins: La Cage aux Folles
- 5 wins: The Real Thing
- 2 wins: Sunday in the Park with George and The Tap Dance Kid

== See also ==
- Drama Desk Awards
- 1984 Laurence Olivier Awards – equivalent awards for West End theatre productions
- Obie Award
- New York Drama Critics' Circle
- Theatre World Award
- Lucille Lortel Awards
