= Ian McKellen on Stage: With Tolkien, Shakespeare, Others and YOU =

- Poster for the UK and Ireland tour
- Written by: Ian McKellen (performer); Various writers
- Based on: Career of Ian McKellen
- Original language: English
- Genre: One-person show

Premiere
- Date premiered: 3 July 2017
- Place premiered: Park Theatre, London

Ian McKellen on Stage: With Tolkien, Shakespeare, Others and YOU is a one-man stage performance by English stage and screen actor Sir Ian McKellen.

The performance sees McKellen reprising roles over his career in the theatre (such as the works of William Shakespeare), on film (such as Gandalf in J. R. R. Tolkien's The Lord of the Rings film series) while discussing anecdotes throughout his life and career.

All profits for ticket sales were donated to each venue and organisation for specific causes or an arts-related charity.

== Performances ==
=== Park Theatre, London (2017) ===
McKellen first presented the show as Ian McKellen with Shakespeare, Tolkien, Others & You at the Park Theatre, London from 3 to 9 July 2017, directed by Jez Bond.

=== UK and Ireland tour (2019) ===
To celebrate his 80th birthday, McKellen toured the show across the UK and Ireland from January to September 2019, directed by Sean Mathias and produced by the Ambassador Theatre Group. The tour dates were as follows;

Date	City	Venue
25 January 2019	London	The Space
26 January 2019	London	The Space
28 January 2019	London	National Theatre (Lyttleton)
30 January 2019	London	Young Vic
1 February 2019	London	Rose Theatre Kingston
3 February 2019	London	Bridge Theatre
4 February 2019	London	Richmond Theatre
6 February 2019	London	Above the Stag Theatre
10 February 2019	London	Hampstead Theatre
11 February 2019	London	Arts Theatre
12 February 2019	Windsor	Theatre Royal, Windsor
13 February 2019	Windsor	Theatre Royal, Windsor
15 February 2019	London	Piccadilly Theatre
17 February 2019	London	The Old Vic
19 February 2019	Bristol	Bristol Old Vic
20 February 2019	Bristol	Bristol Old Vic
22 February 2019	London	Royal Court Theatre
24 February 2019	London	Queen's Theatre, Hornchurch
25 February 2019	London	Queen's Theatre, Hornchurch
26 February 2019	London	Royal Academy of Dramatic Art
1 March 2019	London	Donmar Warehouse
3 March 2019	London	Lyric Theatre, Hammersmith
4 March 2019	London	The Questors Theatre
7 March 2019	London	Duke of York's Theatre
8 March 2019	Ipswich	New Wolsey Theatre
9 March 2019	Ipswich	New Wolsey Theatre
10 March 2019	London	Theatre Royal Stratford East
13 March 2019	Swansea	Swansea Grand Theatre
14 March 2019	Aberystwyth	Aberystwyth Arts Centre
15 March 2019	Aberystwyth	Aberystwyth Arts Centre
16 March 2019	Newtown	Hafren
18 March 2019	Mold	Theatr Clwyd
19 March 2019	Mold	Theatr Clwyd
24 March 2019	Bath	Theatre Royal, Bath
25 March 2019	Ilfracombe	Landmark Theatre
29 March 2019	Norwich	Maddermarket Theatre
30 March 2019	Norwich	Maddermarket Theatre
2 April 2019	Folkestone	Leas Cliff Hall
5 April 2019	Chichester	Minerva Theatre, Chichester
10 April 2019	Southampton	Nuffield Theatre
12 April 2019	Bury St Edmunds	Theatre Royal, Bury St Edmunds
13 April 2019	Bury St Edmunds	Theatre Royal, Bury St Edmunds
14 April 2019	Northampton	Royal & Derngate
16 April 2019	Frinton-on-Sea	Frinton Summer Festival
17 April 2019	Colchester	Mercury Theatre, Colchester
18 April 2019	Colchester	Mercury Theatre, Colchester
20 April 2019	Coventry	Belgrade Theatre
24 April 2019	Norwich	Norwich Playhouse
25 April 2019	Norwich	Norwich Playhouse
27 April 2019	King's Lynn	Guildhall of St George
28 April 2019	King's Lynn	Guildhall of St George
30 April 2019	Oxford	Oxford Playhouse
1 May 2019	Oxford	Oxford Playhouse
3 May 2019	Jersey	Jersey Opera House
4 May 2019	Jersey	Jersey Opera House
6 May 2019	Aylesbury	Aylesbury Waterside Theatre
7 May 2019	Cheltenham	Everyman Theatre, Cheltenham
8 May 2019	Cheltenham	Everyman Theatre, Cheltenham
10 May 2019	Cambridge	Cambridge Arts Theatre
11 May 2019	Cambridge	Cambridge Arts Theatre
13 May 2019	Wigan	Little Theatre
14 May 2019	Wigan	Little Theatre
15 May 2019	Stockport	Forum Theatre
17 May 2019	Liverpool	Liverpool Playhouse
18 May 2019	Liverpool	Liverpool Playhouse
19 May 2019	Coventry	Warwick Arts Centre
20 May 2019	Blackpool	Grand Theatre, Blackpool
23 May 2019	Burnley	Burnley Youth Theatre
25 May 2019	Bolton	The Albert Halls
28 May 2019	Lancaster	The Dukes
31 May 2019	Buxton	Buxton Opera House
1 June 2019	Leicester	Curve
2 June 2019	Leicester	Curve
3 June 2019	Sheffield	Crucible Theatre
4 June 2019	Wakefield	Theatre Royal, Wakefield
5 June 2019	Manchester	HOME
6 June 2019	Manchester	HOME
9 June 2019	Billingham	Forum
11 June 2019	Barnsley	Civic
12 June 2019	Doncaster	Cast
14 June 2019	Richmond	Georgian Theatre Royal
16 June 2019	Hull	Hull New Theatre
17 June 2019	York	Opera House
21 June 2019	Birmingham	Birmingham Repertory Theatre
22 June 2019	Birmingham	Birmingham Repertory Theatre
25 June 2019	Nottingham	Nottingham Playhouse
26 June 2019	Nottingham	Nottingham Playhouse
27 June 2019	Cardiff	New Theatre, Cardiff
28 June 2019	Cardiff	New Theatre, Cardiff
1 July 2019	Exeter	Northcott Theatre
2 July 2019	Poole	Lighthouse
3 July 2019	Lyme Regis	Marine Theatre
5 July 2019	Newbury	Watermill Theatre
15 July 2019	Brighton	Theatre Royal, Brighton
16 July 2019	Brighton	Theatre Royal, Brighton
17 July 2019	Brighton	Theatre Royal, Brighton
18 July 2019	Brighton	Theatre Royal, Brighton
19 July 2019	Brighton	Theatre Royal, Brighton
21 July 2019	Stratford-upon-Avon	Swan Theatre
21 July 2019	Stratford-upon-Avon	Royal Shakespeare Theatre
25 July 2019	Belfast	Lyric Theatre
26 July 2019	Belfast	Lyric Theatre
27 July 2019	Derry	Waterside Theatre
29 July 2019	Ballymena	The Braid
31 July 2019	Newtownabbey	Theatre at the Mill
1 August 2019	Newtownabbey	Theatre at the Mill
9 August 2019	Dundee	Dundee Repertory Theatre
11 August 2019	Pitlochry	Pitlochry Festival Theatre
12 August 2019	Inverness	Eden Court Theatre
14 August 2019	Aberdeen	Tivoli Theatre
18 August 2019	Newcastle upon Tyne	Theatre Royal, Newcastle
20 August 2019	Keswick	Theatre by the Lake
22 August 2019	Edinburgh	Edinburgh International Festival
23 August 2019	Edinburgh	Edinburgh International Festival
24 August 2019	Edinburgh	Edinburgh International Festival
25 August 2019	Edinburgh	Edinburgh International Festival
28 August 2019	Orkney	Orkney Theatre
15 September 2019	London	National Theatre (Olivier)

=== Harold Pinter Theatre, London (2019-2020) ===
Following the success of the UK and Ireland tour, it was announced that McKellen would perform the show at the Harold Pinter Theatre in London's West End for a limited run from 20 September 2019 to 5 January 2020.

=== Hudson Theatre, Broadway (One Make Believe) (2019) ===
For one night only on the 5 November 2019, McKellen performed the show at the Hudson Theatre on Broadway as part of the Only Make Believe charity.

== Home media ==
The show was recorded during the run at the Harold Pinter Theatre in the West End by the National Theatre where it can be rented or seen as part of a subscription. It was also released on Amazon Prime Video on 11 June 2021, but is currently only available on National Theatre at Home as of 2026.
