= Wigan Little Theatre =

Community theatre in Wigan, England

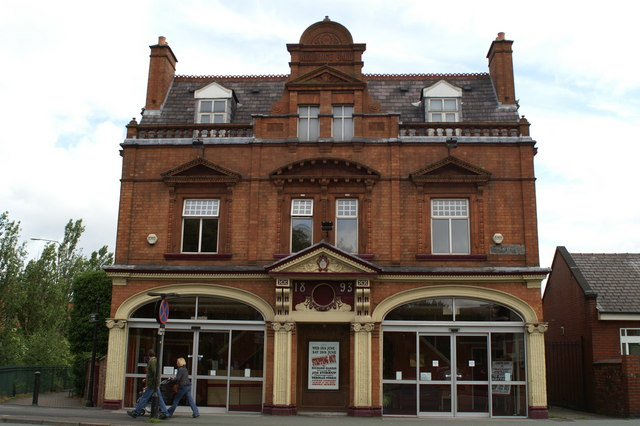
- Entrance to Wigan Little Theatre
- Interactive map of Wigan Little Theatre
- Address: Crompton Street, Wigan; Wigan; UK
- Coordinates: 53°32′50″N 2°37′38″W
- Capacity: 230

Construction
- Opened: 1947

Website
- www.wiganlittletheatre.co.uk

Wigan Little Theatre is a community theatre in Wigan, England. It is a charitable, voluntary organisation that was founded in 1943. It offers a diverse range of theatrical productions, from plays, pantomimes and contemporary works, and provides opportunities for local talent to participate in acting and stagecraft. The theatre also runs a youth program. It is situated on Crompton Street in Wigan, a venue it moved into in 1947. It holds the Queen's Award for Voluntary Service the highest award given to voluntary groups in the UK. In 2019, it hosted a visit from the then Prince of Wales, now Charles III.

== History ==
Wigan Little Theatre was founded in 1943 when a small group of theatre enthusiasts established a drama society at 56a Market Street. They performed three plays annually in a local church hall until the end of World War II. After the war, the group sought a permanent venue and found a derelict cinema, the Alliance Picture House, on Crompton Street. Originally built in 1893 as a Salvation Army citadel, the building was transformed by volunteer labour due to post-war construction restrictions. Volunteers reworked the building, creating a foyer, dressing rooms, a wardrobe department, and extending the stage to increase seating to 250.

The theatre opened in 1948 with She Stoops to Conquer and now stages up to nine productions per season. Sir Ian McKellen saw his first Shakespeare production at the theatre in the 1950s an experience that helped shape his career. Over the years, it has undergone multiple renovations, including lighting and sound upgrades, a new workshop and bar in the 1970s, and a major refurbishment in the 1980s. Rehearsal spaces were added in the 2000s. In 2016, Wigan Little Theatre donated its archives to Wigan Archives & Local Studies, which include digital copies of historical programmes, photographs and memorabilia. An appeal to refurbish the theatre was launched in 2024 with a fundraising target of £30,000.
