= Families and Friends of Lesbians and Gays =

British LGBTQ charity

FFLAG (formerly: Families and Friends of Lesbians and Gays)
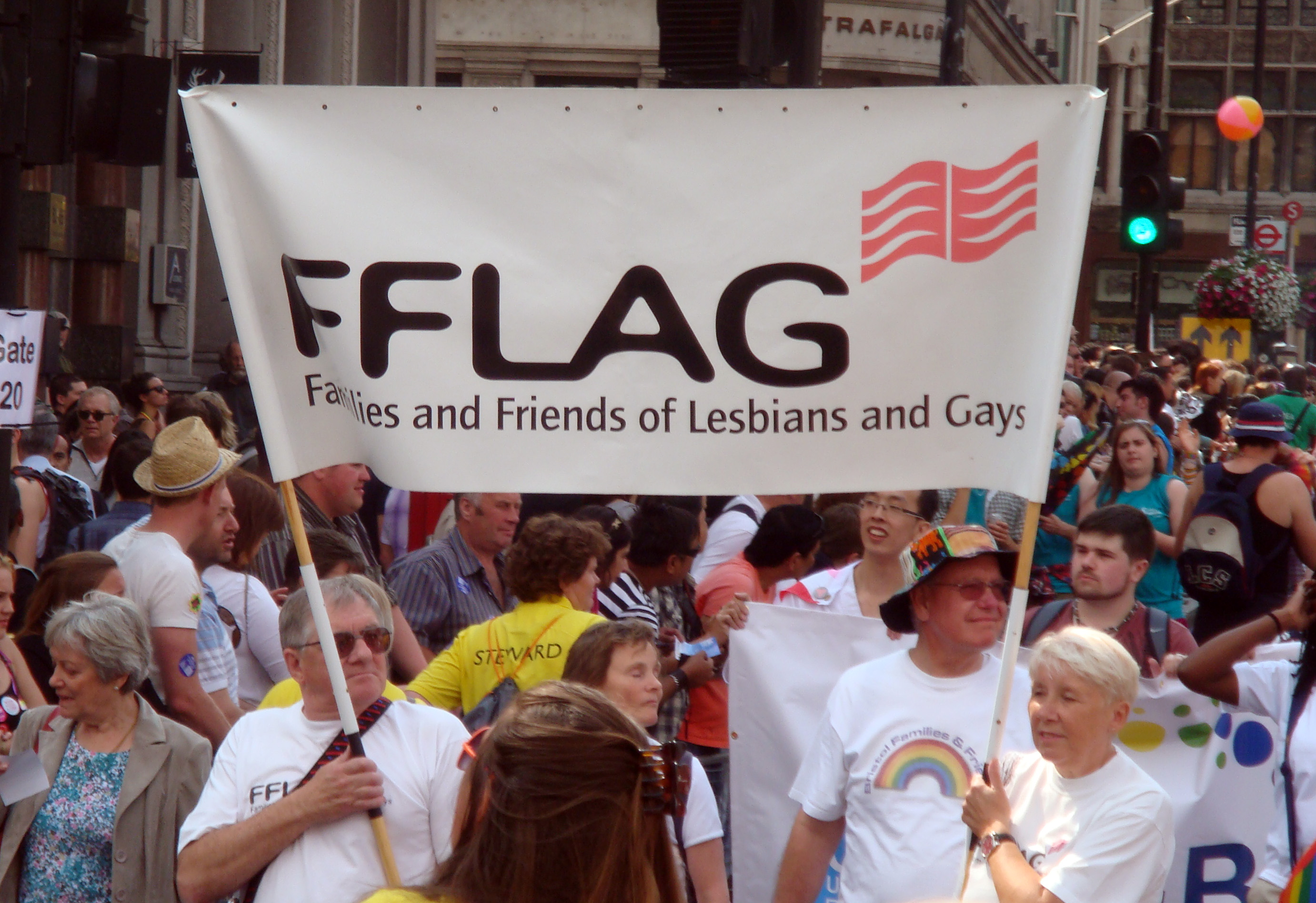
- FFLAG at Pride in London 2011
- Formation: 1965; 61 years ago
- Type: Charity
- Headquarters: Bristol
- Region served: Great Britain
- President: Jenny Broughton
- Budget: £38,538
- Website: fflag.org.uk

FFLAG, formerly Families and Friends of Lesbians and Gays, is a voluntary organisation and registered charity in the United Kingdom which offers support to parents and their LGBTQ (lesbian, gay, bisexual, transgender and queer) children. They have a national helpline as well as several parent support groups. FFLAG also works outside the UK with other LGBT family support organisations, particularly in Europe.

== Background ==
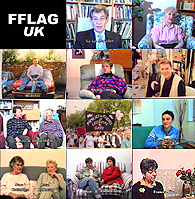
Members of FFLAG in the video Parents Talking, c. 1990

The organisation has its roots in 1965 when Rose Robertson (née Laimbeer, 28 October 1916–10 August 2011), a former World War II SOE agent, set up Parents Enquiry, inspired by her experiences working with the resistance in occupied France. Rose was herself heterosexual and had married George Robertson in 1954; he died in 1984. Rose launched Britain's first helpline to assist, inform and support parents and their lesbian, gay and bisexual children. Robertson usually received over 100 phone calls and letters a week from distressed gay teenagers, many of whom had self-harmed. She often acted as a mediator between parents who had rejected their own sons and daughters due to their child's sexuality, mostly successfully. She was verbally abused, physically attacked, and targeted with homophobia from right-wing extremists including arson attacks on her home, excrement posted through her letterbox, abusive phone calls and hate mail. Though Parents Enquiry ceased operations in the 1990s, Robertson continued to help young LGBTQ people until her death. Obituaries to Rose appeared in The Daily Telegraph, The Guardian and the Pink Paper, as well as from the Peter Tatchell Foundation.

== History ==
Friends and Families of Lesbians and Gays (FFLAG) was set up in 1993. It is considered a continuation of Robertson's work. Founder members included Jenny Broughton, a former actress and librarian whose daughter came out as a lesbian at 17 years old. FFLAG became a registered charity in 2000.

In 2014, Broughton won an MBE for her status as a founding member of FFLAG in that year's New Year Honours. In 2022, Bristol chapter founders Sue and Bob Allen and Janet and Bruce Kent were awarded the CEO's Award by Trans in the City, a not-for-profit organization supporting transgender and nonbinary people in business.

In 2026 upon the appointment of a new Health Secretary, James Murray, trustees of FFLAG said, “We urge [Murray] to reverse the restrictions on gender-affirming care for young people, and ensure the NHS provides timely, holistic care to all trans people, on the basis of informed consent."

== See also ==
- PFLAG
