= Mel Hutchwright =

Character from British soap Coronation Street

- Coronation Street character
- Portrayed by: Ian McKellen
- First appearance: 1 May 2005
- Last appearance: 22 May 2005
- Introduced by: Tony Wood
- Crossover appearances: The British Soap Awards (2019)
In-universe information
- Other names: Lionel Hipkiss
- Occupation: Conman

Lionel Hipkiss, using the alias Mel Hutchwright, is a fictional character from the British soap opera Coronation Street, played by Ian McKellen. He made his first on-screen appearance on 1 May 2005 and was last seen on 22 May 2005.

In 2019, McKellen recorded a special message in character as Lionel for Sue Nicholls, who plays Audrey Roberts, on the occasion of her receiving the Outstanding Achievement Award at The British Soap Awards.

== Creation and casting ==
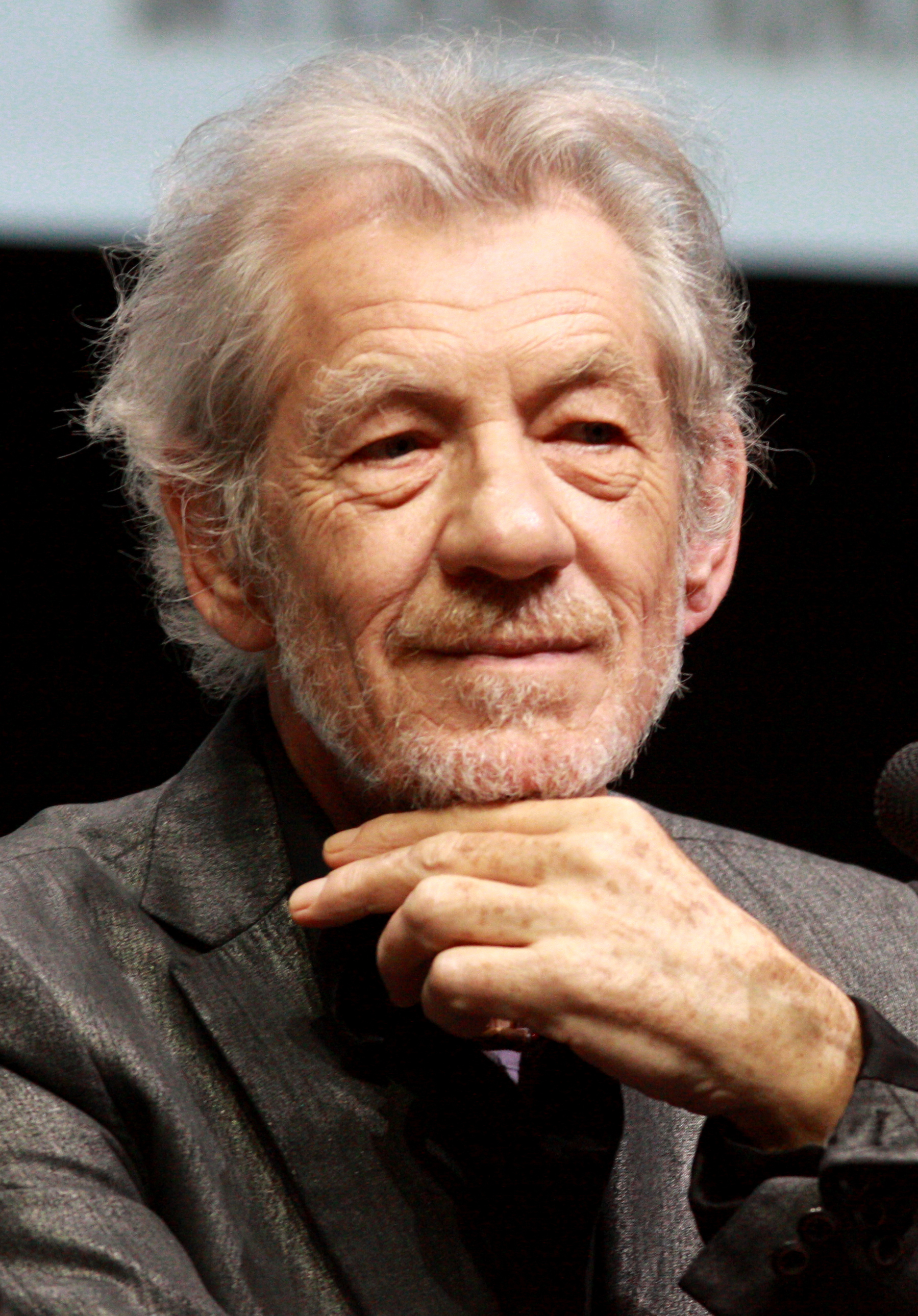
Ian McKellen (pictured) played "dodgy novelist", Mel.

In March 2005, it was announced that British veteran actor Ian McKellen had joined Coronation Street for ten episodes as a "dodgy novelist". Producer Tony Wood said: "We are delighted that an actor of Ian McKellen's calibre has agreed to appear in the show, it is a testament to the direction we have been taking the show in the last 12 months. Ian will be perfect as Mel Hutchwright and the cast and crew are looking forward to working with him on what promises to be a very funny storyline." Wood later revealed that the role of Mel was not originally written for McKellen. Wood and the casting director recalled that McKellen wanted a part in the serial and approached his agent, who was not keen on giving the script to McKellen; however, the actor read it and loved the writing for the character.

McKellen described his experience of working on the set of the show in a humorous account posted on his website: "Often I felt a Pirandellian urge to laugh at it all. For instance, has Mel Hutchwright never watched television that he has to be introduced to characters who've been such a part of the nation's life for nearly half a century? It's like working with a castful of twins. There's fluttery Emily who is a dead ringer for her creator Eileen Derbyshire. Ken Barlow looks just like the amiable Bill Roache. Have Rita and Barbara Knox ever been seen together? Of course they have, all the time! Then I began fantasies of Mel turning up in the Emmerdale bar once he's moved on from the Rover's [sic] . . . or even the bar of the Queen Vic."

== Storylines ==
Mel Hutchwright, the author of novel Hard Grinding, turns up at a book club meeting, having been invited by Blanche Hunt (Maggie Jones). Norris Cole (Malcolm Hebden), Rita Sullivan (Barbara Knox) and Emily Bishop (Eileen Derbyshire) are in awe of the author, but Ken Barlow (William Roache) is unimpressed. Norris offers Mel a bed for the night at Emily's, while Blanche buys his drinks. Mel tells the book club how he has been suffering from writer's block. In the Rovers, he is enthralled to see the women fighting, and declaring it has cured his writer's block, decides he will stay in Weatherfield to complete his book.

Mel continues to sponge off Emily and Norris. When he hears that Ken has written a book, he enjoys poking fun at him. Mel continues to scrounge drinks as he feigns sincerity with Fred Elliott (John Savident) and Norris, saying that he has named two of the heroes in his novel after them. He also dupes Roy Cropper (David Neilson) into giving him a free lunch at the café.

Mel takes Audrey Roberts (Sue Nicholls) for lunch at the Clock Restaurant. He gets drunk and manages to trick Audrey into paying the bill by promising to base the hero of his book on her late husband Alf Roberts (Bryan Mosley). Drunken Mel suggests to Audrey they should go for a "lie down", which she refuses.

Mel is not who he appears to be, and the first signs of this are seen when Norris discovers Mel is not typing in the front room of Emily's house at all, but is using a tape recording of someone typing. He is hurt to realise that Mel lied to him, but Mel manages to worm his way out of it. Norris intends to persuade the book club to raise the money to fund the publishing of Mel's next book. Mel is about to leave, having stolen some of Emily's ornaments, when Norris tells him about his idea of raising money for his book. Mel secretly replaces the ornaments, and agrees to stay.

Norris then gets everyone at the book club except Ken to agree to put in £200 to pay for the publishing of Mel's The Canary's Last Song. Ken does not trust Mel, and resolves to expose him for what he is. Mel tells Norris to get the book club members to make their cheques out to Lionel Hipkiss, his publisher.

The club meets at the café, and hands their money over to Mel. To thank them, he reads a passage from his book. Ken arrives at the book club and exposes Mel as a fraud. Mel's real name is in fact Lionel Hipkiss, and he has pulled similar scams at book clubs all over the country. Emily, Blanche, Roy, Rita, Audrey, Fred and Norris are shocked, and demand their money back. Norris orders Mel out of the café after he insults them all. None of the book club members report Mel to the police, embarrassed that they were taken in by a conman.

== Reception ==
The Guardian critic Grace Dent described the character as "a pretentious bore," and praised Coronation Street for being "streets ahead." In the same article Dent went on to say "he's unwashed, sleazy and a leading authority on "the working man" and his "daily struggle", no mean feat considering Mel's spent the past three decades in a dressing gown and flip-flops listening to the World Service." During a feature on famous faces in Coronation Street, Tom Cole of the Radio Times said McKellen's casting was "show-stealing" and "one in the eye for any snobs who'd call soap operas vulgar or trashy." Cole added "Playing smooth-talking conman Mel Hutchwright, McKellen's performance in Corrie was as enchanting as a kaleidoscope and intoxicating as a fine single malt."
