= Ian McKellen =

English actor (born 1939)

Sir Ian McKellen CH CBE
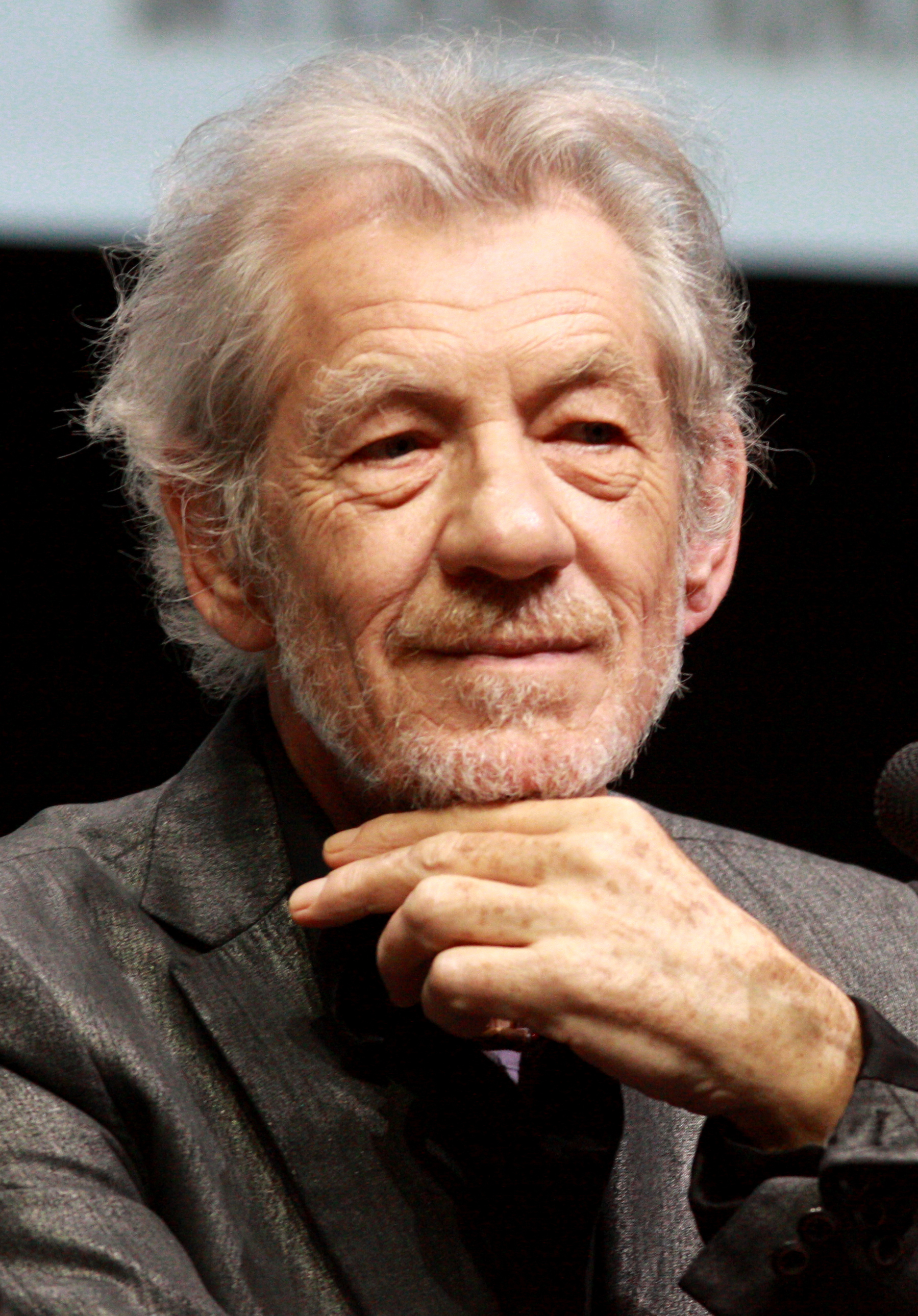
- McKellen in 2013
- Born: Ian Murray McKellen; 25 May 1939 (age 87); Burnley, Lancashire, England
- Education: University of Cambridge (BA)
- Occupation: Actor
- Years active: 1958–present
- Works: Full list
- Partners: Brian Taylor (1964–1972); Sean Mathias (1978–1988)
- Awards: Full list
- Website: mckellen.com

Sir Ian Murray McKellen (born 25 May 1939) is an English actor. Widely considered one of Britain's greatest actors, he is noted for his versatile roles on stage and screen, in genres ranging from Shakespearean dramas and modern theatre to popular fantasy and science fiction. He is regarded as a British cultural icon and was knighted by Queen Elizabeth II in 1991. He has received numerous accolades, including a Tony Award, six Laurence Olivier Awards, two Actor Awards and a Golden Globe Award, in addition to nominations for two Academy Awards, five BAFTAs and five Primetime Emmy Awards.

McKellen made his stage debut in 1961 at the Belgrade Theatre as a member of its repertory company. In 1965, he debuted at the West End and on Broadway. In 1969, he was invited to join the Prospect Theatre Company to play the lead roles in Shakespeare's Richard II and Christopher Marlowe's Edward II. In the 1970s, McKellen became a stalwart of the Royal Shakespeare Company and the National Theatre of Great Britain. He earned Olivier Awards for his performances in the London productions of Pillars of the Community (1977), The Alchemist (1978), Bent (1979), Wild Honey (1984), and Richard III (1995). He also received the Tony Award for Best Actor in a Play for his role as Antonio Salieri in Amadeus (1980), and was nominated for Ian McKellen: Acting Shakespeare (1984). On Broadway, McKellen also appeared in Wild Honey (1986), Dance of Death (1990), No Man's Land (2013), and Waiting for Godot (2013), the latter two being joint productions with Patrick Stewart.

McKellen achieved worldwide fame for his film roles, including King Richard III in Richard III (1995), James Whale in Gods and Monsters (1998), Magneto in the X-Men film series (2000–2014) and Avengers: Doomsday (2026), Cogsworth in Beauty and the Beast (2017) and Gandalf in The Lord of the Rings (2001–2003) and The Hobbit (2012–2014) trilogies. He also appeared in the films A Touch of Love (1969), Plenty (1985), Six Degrees of Separation (1993), Restoration (1995), Flushed Away (2006), Mr. Holmes (2015), and The Good Liar (2019).

McKellen came out as gay in 1988, and has since championed LGBT social movements worldwide. He is a cofounder of Stonewall, an LGBT rights lobby group in the United Kingdom, named after the Stonewall riots. He is patron of LGBT History Month, Pride London, Oxford Pride, GayGlos, LGBT Foundation and FFLAG.

== Early life and education ==
Ian Murray McKellen was born on 25 May 1939 in Burnley, Lancashire, (Note: Attributed to multiple references:) the son of Margery Lois (née Sutcliffe) and Denis Murray McKellen. He has an older sister, Jean. Several months after McKellen's birth, his family moved to Wigan, where they lived until McKellen was twelve. The family moved to Bolton in 1951 after McKellen's father was promoted. Living through World War II as a young child had a lasting impact on McKellen; he later said that "only after peace resumed ... did [he] realise that war wasn't normal".

McKellen's father was a civil engineer and a lay preacher, and was of Protestant Irish and Scottish descent. Both of McKellen's grandfathers were preachers, and his great-great-grandfather, James McKellen, was an evangelical Protestant minister in Ballymena, County Antrim, Northern Ireland. McKellen's great-great-grandfather, Robert J. Lowes, was an activist in the successful campaign for a Saturday half-holiday in Manchester, which preceded the modern five-day work week. McKellen's mother died of breast cancer when he was 12, and his father died when McKellen was 25. According to McKellen's official website, his early interest in theatre was encouraged by his parents, who took him to see Peter Pan at the Manchester Opera House when he was three, and gave him a toy Victorian theatre for Christmas when he was nine.

McKellen attended Bolton School, and his acting career began at Bolton Little Theatre. At the age of 18, he won a scholarship to the University of Cambridge, where he studied English literature at St Catharine's College. While at Cambridge, McKellen was a member of the Marlowe Society theatre club, and appeared in 23 plays over the course of three years. His roles included Justice Shallow in Henry IV alongside Trevor Nunn and Derek Jacobi; Posthumus in Cymbeline opposite Margaret Drabble; and three roles in Doctor Faustus. During this period McKellen was directed by Peter Hall, John Barton, and Dadie Rylands.

== Career ==
=== 1965–1985: National Theatre acclaim ===
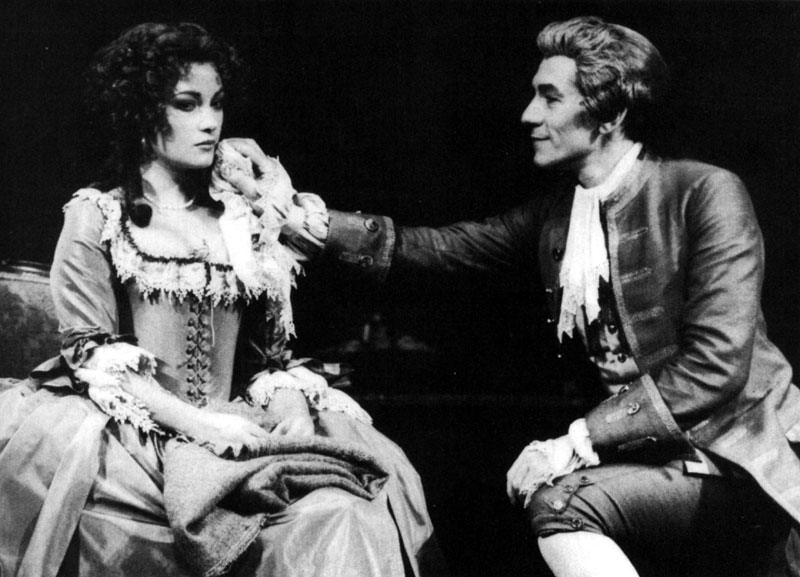
McKellen (Antonio Salieri) alongside Jane Seymour (Constanze Mozart) in Amadeus, c. 1981

McKellen made his first professional appearance in 1961 at the Belgrade Theatre in Coventry, as Roper in A Man for All Seasons, although an audio recording of the Marlowe Society's Cymbeline had gone on commercial sale as part of the Argo Shakespeare series. After four years in regional repertory theatres, McKellen made his first West End appearance, in A Scent of Flowers, regarded as a "notable success". In 1965, he was a member of Laurence Olivier's National Theatre Company at the Old Vic, which led to roles at the Chichester Festival. With the Prospect Theatre Company, McKellen made his breakthrough performances of Shakespeare's Richard II (directed by Richard Cottrell) and Christopher Marlowe's Edward II (directed by Toby Robertson) at the Edinburgh Festival in 1969, the latter causing a storm of protest over the enactment of the homosexual Edward's lurid death.

One of his first major roles on television was as the title character in the BBC's 1966 adaptation of David Copperfield, which achieved 12 million viewers on its initial airings. After some rebroadcasting in the late 60s, the master videotapes for the serial were wiped, and only four scattered episodes (3, 8, 9 and 11) survive as telerecordings, three of which feature McKellen as adult David. McKellen had taken film roles throughout his career—beginning in 1969 with his role of George Matthews in A Touch of Love, and his first leading role was in 1980 as D. H. Lawrence in Priest of Love, but it was not until the 1990s that he became more widely recognised in this medium after several roles in blockbuster Hollywood films. In 1969, McKellen starred in three films, Michael Hayes's The Promise, Clive Donner's epic film Alfred the Great, and Waris Hussein's A Touch of Love (1969).

In the 1970s, McKellen became a well-known figure in British theatre, performing frequently at the Royal Shakespeare Company and the Royal National Theatre, where he played several leading Shakespearean roles. From 1973 to 1974, McKellen toured the United Kingdom and Brooklyn Academy of Music portraying Lady Wishfort's Footman, Kruschov, and Edgar in the William Congreve comedy The Way of the World, Anton Chekhov's comedic three-act play The Wood Demon and William Shakespeare tragedy King Lear. The following year, he starred in Shakespeare's King John, George Colman's The Clandestine Marriage, and George Bernard Shaw's Too True to Be Good. From 1976 to 1977, he portrayed Romeo in the Shakespeare romance Romeo & Juliet at the Royal Shakespeare Theatre. The following year he played King Leontes in The Winter's Tale.

In 1976, he played the title role in William Shakespeare's Macbeth at Stratford in a "gripping ... out of the ordinary" production, with Judi Dench, and Iago in Othello, in award-winning productions directed by Trevor Nunn. Both of these productions were adapted into television films, also directed by Nunn. From 1978 to 1979, he toured in a double feature production of Shakespeare's Twelfth Night, and Anton Chekov's Three Sisters portraying Sir Toby Belch and Andrei, respectively. In 1979, McKellen gained acclaim for his role as Antonio Salieri in the Broadway transfer production of Peter Shaffer's play Amadeus. It was an immensely popular play produced by the National Theatre originally starring Paul Scofield. The transfer starred McKellen, Tim Curry as Wolfgang Amadeus Mozart, and Jane Seymour as Constanze Mozart. The New York Times theatre critic Frank Rich wrote of McKellen's performance "In Mr. McKellen's superb performance, Salieri's descent into madness was portrayed in dark notes of almost bone-rattling terror". For his performance, McKellen received the Tony Award for Best Actor in a Play.

In 1981, McKellen portrayed writer and poet D. H. Lawrence in the Christopher Miles directed biographical film, Priest of Love. He followed up with Michael Mann's horror film The Keep (1983). In 1985, he starred in Plenty, the film adaptation of the David Hare play of the same name. The film was directed by Fred Schepisi and starred Meryl Streep, Charles Dance, John Gielgud, and Sting. The film spans nearly 20 years from the early 1940s to the 1960s, around an Englishwoman's experiences as a fighter for the French Resistance during World War II when she has a one-night stand with a British intelligence agent. The film received mixed reviews with Roger Ebert of The Chicago Sun-Times praising the film's ensemble cast writing, "The performances in the movie supply one brilliant solo after another; most of the big moments come as characters dominate the scenes they are in".

=== 1986–2000: Established actor ===
In 1986, he returned to Broadway in the revival of Anton Chekhov's first play Wild Honey alongside Kim Cattrall and Kate Burton. The play concerned a local Russian schoolteacher who struggles to remain faithful to his wife, despite the attention of three other women. McKellen received mixed reviews from critics in particular Frank Rich of The New York Times who praised him for his "bravura and athletically graceful technique that provides everything except, perhaps, the thing that matters most—sustained laughter". He later wrote, "Mr. McKellen finds himself in the peculiar predicament of the star who strains to carry a frail supporting cast". In 1989 he played Iago in production of Othello by the Royal Shakespeare Company. McKellen starred in the British drama Scandal (1989) a fictionalised account of the Profumo affair that rocked the government of British prime minister Harold Macmillan. McKellen portrayed John Profumo. The film starred Joanne Whalley, and John Hurt. The film premiered at the 1989 Cannes Film Festival and competed for the Palme d'Or. When his friend and colleague, Patrick Stewart, decided to accept the role of Captain Jean-Luc Picard in the American television series, Star Trek: The Next Generation, McKellen strongly advised him not to throw away his respected theatrical career to work in television. However, McKellen later conceded that Stewart had been prudent in accepting the role, which made him a global star and later followed his example such as co-starring with Stewart in the X-Men superhero film series.

From 1990 to 1992, he acted in a world tour of a lauded revival of Richard III, playing the title character. The production played at the Brooklyn Academy of Music for two weeks before continuing its tour where Frank Rich of New York Times was able to review it. In his piece, he praised McKellen's performance writing, "Mr McKellen's highly sophisticated sense of theatre and fun drives him to reveal the secrets of how he pulls his victims' strings whether he is addressing the audience in a soliloquy or not". For his performance he received the Laurence Olivier Award for Best Actor.

In 1992, he acted in Pam Gems's revival of Chekov's Uncle Vanya at the Royal National Theatre alongside Antony Sher, and Janet McTeer. In 1993, he starred in the film Six Degrees of Separation based on the Pulitzer Prize and Tony Award nominated play of the same name. McKellen starred alongside Will Smith, Donald Sutherland and Stockard Channing. The film was a critical success. That same year, he appeared in the western The Ballad of Little Jo opposite Bob Hoskins and the action comedy Last Action Hero starring Arnold Schwarzenegger. The following year, he appeared in the superhero film The Shadow with Alec Baldwin and the James L. Brooks directed comedy I'll Do Anything starring Nick Nolte.

In 1995, McKellen made his screenwriting debut with Richard III, an ambitious adaptation of William Shakespeare's play of the same name, directed by Richard Loncraine. The film reimagines the play's story and characters to a setting based on 1930s Britain, with Richard depicted as a fascist plotting to usurp the throne. McKellen stars in the title role alongside an ensemble cast including Annette Bening, Robert Downey Jr., Jim Broadbent, Kristen Scott Thomas, Nigel Hawthorne and Maggie Smith. As executive producer he returned his £50,000 fee to complete the filming of the final battle. In his review of the film, The Washington Post film critic Hal Hinson called McKellen's performance a "lethally flamboyant incarnation" and said his "florid mastery ... dominates everything". Film critic Roger Ebert of the Chicago Sun-Times praised McKellen's adaptation and his performance in his four star review writing, "McKellen has a deep sympathy for the playwright ... Here he brings to Shakespeare's most tortured villain a malevolence we are moved to pity. No man should be so evil, and know it. Hitler and others were more evil, but denied out to themselves. There is no escape for Richard. He is one of the first self-aware characters in the theatre, and for that distinction he must pay the price". His performance in the title role garnered BAFTA and Golden Globe nominations for Best Actor and won the European Film Award for Best Actor. His screenplay was nominated for the BAFTA Award for Best Adapted Screenplay. That same year, he appeared in the historical drama Restoration (1995) also starring Downey Jr., as well as Meg Ryan, Hugh Grant, and David Thewlis. He appeared in the British romantic comedy Jack and Sarah (1995) starring Richard E. Grant, Samantha Mathis, and Judi Dench.

In 1993, he appeared in minor roles in the television miniseries Tales of the City, based on the novel by his friend Armistead Maupin. Later that year, McKellen appeared in the HBO television film And the Band Played On based on the acclaimed novel of the same name about the discovery of HIV. For his performance as gay rights activist Bill Kraus, McKellen received the CableACE Award for Supporting Actor in a Movie or Miniseries and was nominated for the Primetime Emmy Award for Outstanding Supporting Actor in a Miniseries or a Movie. From 1993 to 1997 McKellen toured in a one-man show entitled, A Knights Out, about coming out as a gay man. Laurie Winer from The Los Angeles Times wrote, "Even if he is preaching to the converted, McKellen makes us aware of the vast and powerful intolerance outside the comfortable walls of the theatre. Endowed with a rare technique, he is a natural storyteller, an admirable human being and a hands-on activist". From 1997 to 1998, he starred as Dr. Tomas Stockmann in a revival of Henrik Ibsen's An Enemy of the People. Later that year he played Garry Essendine in the Noël Coward comedy Present Laughter at the West Yorkshire Playhouse. In 1998, he appeared in the modestly acclaimed psychological thriller Apt Pupil, which was directed by Bryan Singer and based on a story by Stephen King. McKellen portrayed a fugitive Nazi officer living under a false name in the US who is befriended by a curious teenager (Brad Renfro) who threatens to expose him unless he tells his story in detail. That same year, he played James Whale, the director of Frankenstein in the Bill Condon directed period drama Gods and Monsters, a role for which he was subsequently nominated for the Academy Award for Best Actor, losing it to Roberto Benigni in Life is Beautiful (1998).

In 1995, he appeared in the BBC television comedy film Cold Comfort Farm starring Kate Beckinsale, Rufus Sewell, and Stephen Fry. The following year he starred as Tsar Nicholas II in the HBO made-for-television movie Rasputin: Dark Servant of Destiny (1996) starring Alan Rickman as Rasputin. For his performance, McKellen earned a Primetime Emmy Award for Outstanding Supporting Actor in a Limited Series or Movie nomination and received a Golden Globe Award for Best Supporting Actor – Series, Miniseries or Television Film win. McKellen appeared as Mr Creakle in the BBC series David Copperfield (1999) based on the Charles Dickens classic novel. The miniseries starred a pre-Harry Potter Daniel Radcliffe, Bob Hoskins, and Maggie Smith.

=== 2000–2011: International stardom ===
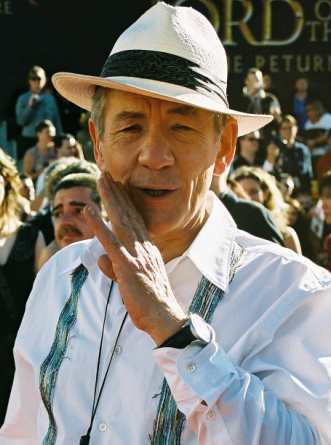
McKellen at the world premiere of The Lord of the Rings: The Return of the King in Wellington, 1 December 2003

In 1999, McKellen was cast, again under the direction of Bryan Singer, to play the comic book supervillain Magneto in the 2000 film X-Men and its sequels X2: X-Men United (2003) and X-Men: The Last Stand (2006). He later reprised his role of Magneto in 2014's X-Men: Days of Future Past, sharing the role with Michael Fassbender, who played a younger version of the character in 2011's X-Men: First Class.

While filming the first X-Men film in 1999, McKellen was cast as the wizard Gandalf in Peter Jackson's film trilogy adaptation of The Lord of the Rings (consisting of The Fellowship of the Ring, The Two Towers, and The Return of the King), released between 2001 and 2003. He won the Screen Actors Guild Award for Best Supporting Actor in a Motion Picture for his work in The Fellowship of the Ring and was nominated for the Academy Award for Best Supporting Actor for the same role. He provided the voice of Gandalf for several video game adaptations of the Lord of the Rings films.

McKellen returned to the Broadway stage in 2001 in an August Strindberg play The Dance of Death alongside Helen Mirren and David Strathairn at the Broadhurst Theatre. The New York Times Theatre critic Ben Brantley praised McKellen's performance writing, "[McKellen] returns to Broadway to serve up an Elysian concoction we get to sample too little these days: a mixture of heroic stage presence, actorly intelligence, and rarefied theatrical technique". McKellen toured with the production at the Lyric Theatre in London's West End and to the Sydney Art's Festival in Australia. On 16 March 2002, he hosted Saturday Night Live.

In 2002 McKellen appeared in a solo performance at the Beverly Hills Canon Theatre, where he performed his personally written scene from a Shakespeare annexe piece. An essay on the event was published May 2026 in the Lincoln England international magazine "The Lincoln Review".

In 2003 McKellen made a guest appearance as himself on the American cartoon show The Simpsons in a special British-themed episode entitled "The Regina Monologues", along with the then UK Prime Minister Tony Blair and author J. K. Rowling. In April and May 2005, he played the role of Mel Hutchwright in Granada Television's long-running British soap opera, Coronation Street, fulfilling a lifelong ambition, where in 2015 he was gifted a cobble from the soap's exterior set for his seventy-sixth birthday. He narrated Richard Bell's film Eighteen as a grandfather who leaves his World War II memoirs on audio-cassette for his teenage grandson.

He has appeared in limited release films, such as Emile (which was shot in three weeks following the X2 shoot), Neverwas and Asylum. In 2006, he appeared as Sir Leigh Teabing in The Da Vinci Code opposite Tom Hanks as Robert Langdon. During a 17 May 2006 interview on The Today Show with the Da Vinci Code cast and director Ron Howard, Matt Lauer posed a question to the group about how they would have felt if the film had borne a prominent disclaimer that it is a work of fiction, as some religious groups wanted. McKellen responded, "I've often thought the Bible should have a disclaimer in the front saying 'This is fiction'. I mean, walking on water? It takes ... an act of faith. And I have faith in this movie—not that it's true, not that it's factual, but that it's a jolly good story". He continued, "And I think audiences are clever enough and bright enough to separate out fact and fiction, and discuss the thing when they've seen it".

McKellen appeared in the 2006 BBC series of Ricky Gervais's comedy series Extras, where he played himself directing Gervais's character Andy Millman in a play about gay lovers. McKellen received a 2007 Primetime Emmy Award for Outstanding Guest Actor – Comedy Series nomination for his performance. In 2007, McKellen narrated the romantic fantasy adventure film Stardust starring Charlie Cox and Claire Danes, which was a critical and financial success. That same year, he lent his voice to the armoured bear Iorek Byrnison in the Chris Weitz-directed fantasy film The Golden Compass based on the acclaimed Philip Pullman novel Northern Lights and starred Nicole Kidman and Daniel Craig. The film received mixed reviews but was a financial success.

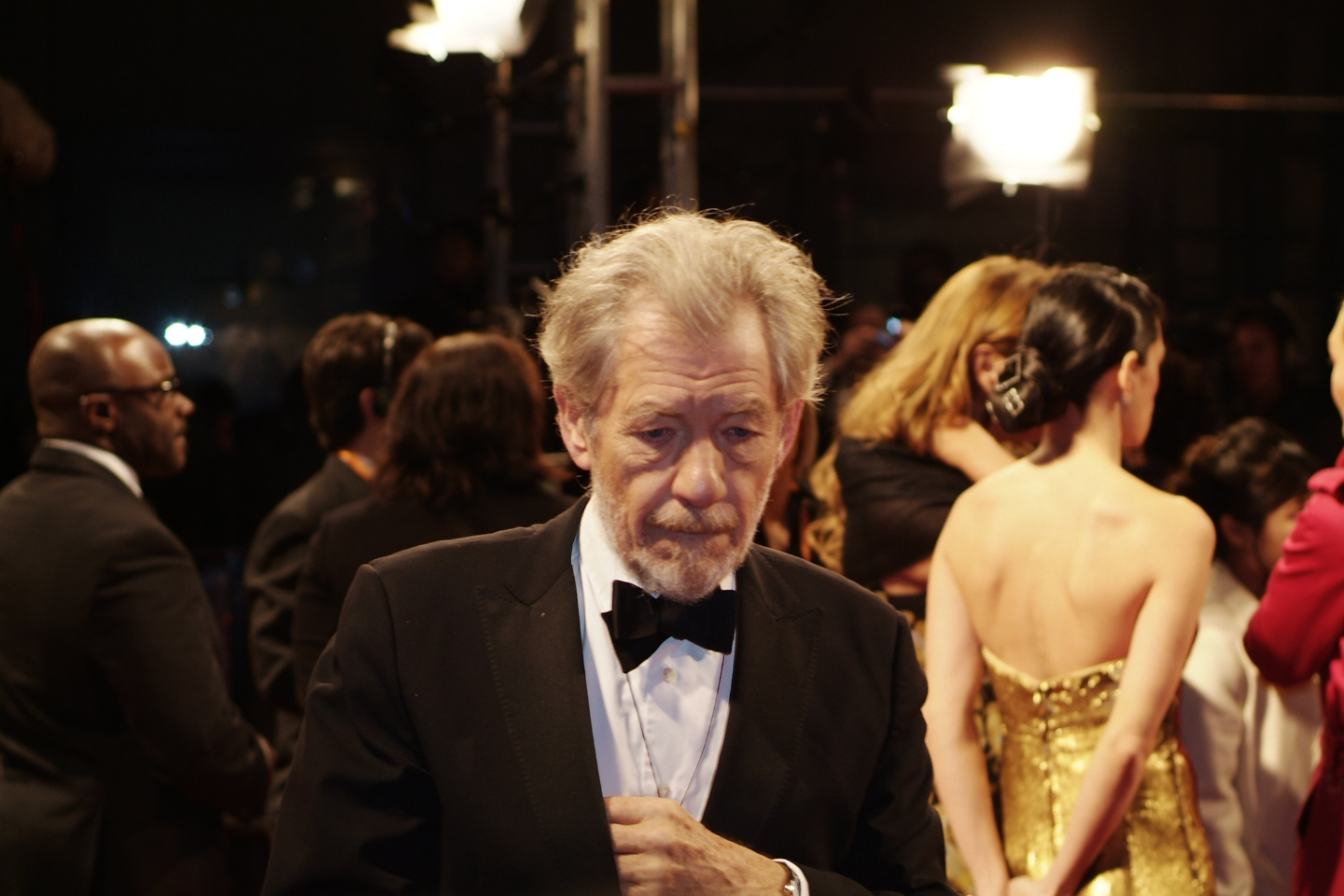
McKellen at the 2007 BAFTA Awards

In 2007, he returned to the Royal Shakespeare Company, in productions of King Lear and The Seagull, both directed by Trevor Nunn. In 2009 he portrayed Number Two in The Prisoner, a remake of the 1967 cult series The Prisoner. In 2009, he appeared in a very popular revival of Waiting for Godot at London's Haymarket Theatre, directed by Sean Mathias, and playing opposite Patrick Stewart. From 2013 to 2014, McKellen and Stewart starred in a double production of Samuel Beckett's Waiting for Godot and Harold Pinter's No Man's Land on Broadway at the Cort Theatre. Variety theatre critic Marilyn Stasio praised the dual production writing, "McKellen and Stewart find plenty of consoling comedy in two masterpieces of existential despair". In both productions of Stasio claims, "the two thespians play the parts they were meant to play". He is Patron of English Touring Theatre and also President and Patron of the Little Theatre Guild of Great Britain, an association of amateur theatre organisations throughout the UK. In late August 2012, he took part in the opening ceremony of the London Paralympics, portraying Prospero from The Tempest.

=== Since 2012: Career expansion ===
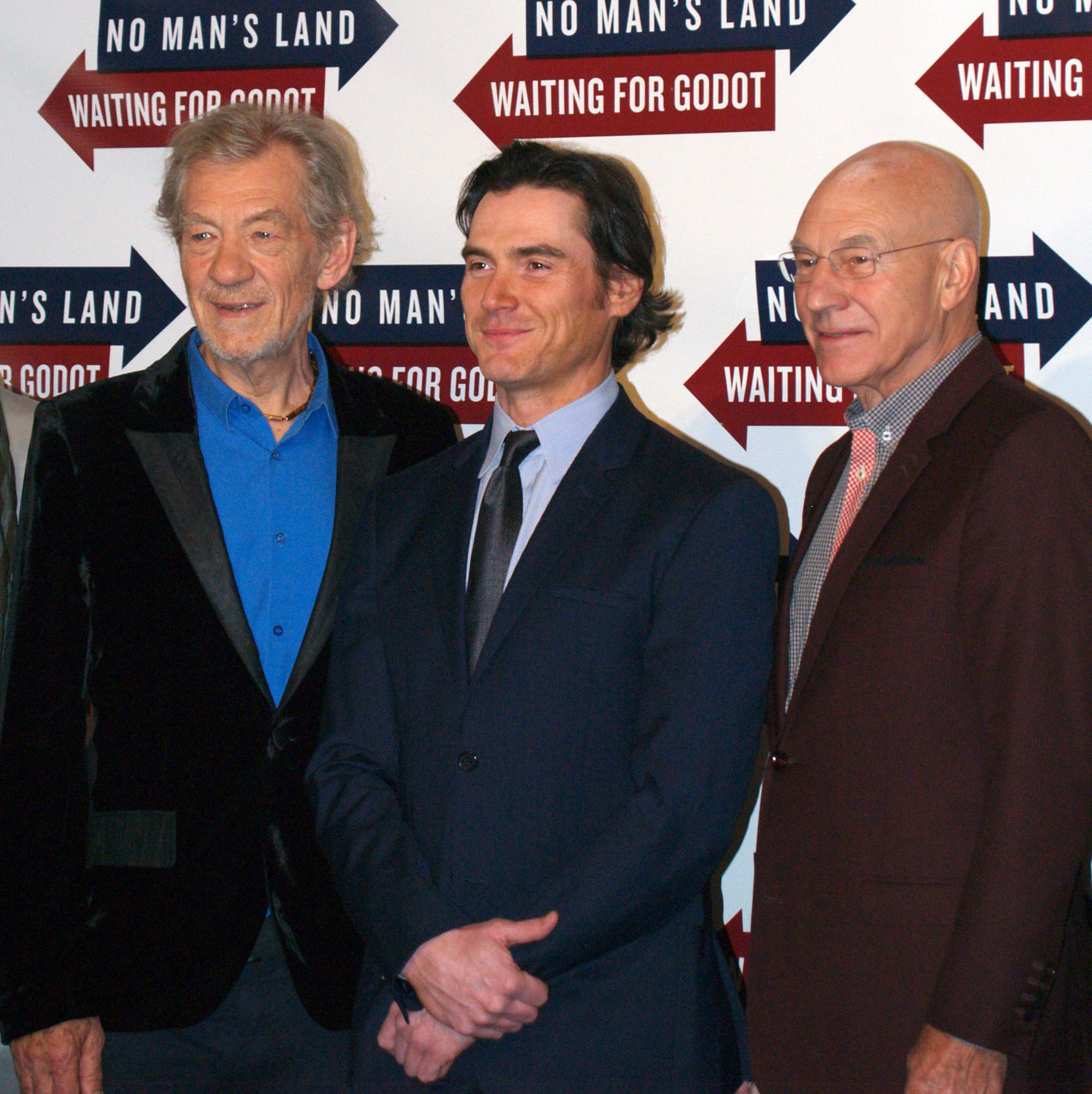
McKellen with Billy Crudup and Patrick Stewart promoting Waiting for Godot and No Man's Land (2013)

McKellen reprised the role of Gandalf on screen in Peter Jackson's three-part film adaptation of The Hobbit starting with The Hobbit: An Unexpected Journey (2012), followed by The Hobbit: The Desolation of Smaug (2013), and finally The Hobbit: The Battle of the Five Armies (2014). Despite the series receiving mixed reviews, it emerged as a financial success. McKellen reprised his role as Erik Lehnsherr/Magneto in James Mangold's The Wolverine (2013), and Singer's X-Men: Days of Future Past (2014). In November 2013, McKellen appeared in the Doctor Who 50th anniversary comedy homage The Five(ish) Doctors Reboot. From 2013 to 2016, McKellen co-starred in the ITV sitcom Vicious as Freddie Thornhill, alongside Derek Jacobi. The series revolves around an elderly gay couple who have been together for 50 years. The show's original title was "Vicious Old Queens". There are ongoing jokes about McKellen's career as a relatively unsuccessful character actor who owns a tux because he stole it after doing a guest spot on "Downton Abbey" and that he holds the title of "10th Most Popular 'Doctor Who' Villain". Liz Shannon Miller of IndieWire noted that while the concept seemed "weird as hell", "Once you come to accept McKellen and Jacobi in a multi-camera format, there is a lot to respect about their performances; specifically, the way that those decades of classical training adapt themselves to the sitcom world. Much has been written before about how the tradition of the multi-cam, filmed in front of a studio audience, relates to theatre, and McKellen and Jacobi know how to play to a live crowd".

In 2015, McKellen reunited with director Bill Condon playing an elderly Sherlock Holmes in the mystery film Mr. Holmes alongside Laura Linney. In the film based on the novel A Slight Trick of the Mind (2005), Holmes now 93, struggles to recall the details of his final case because his mind is slowly deteriorating. The film premiered at the 65th Berlin International Film Festival with McKellen receiving acclaim for his performance. Rolling Stone film critic Peter Travers praised his performance writing, "Don't think you can take another Hollywood version of Sherlock Holmes? Snap out of it. Apologies to Robert Downey Jr. and Benedict Cumberbatch, but what Ian McKellen does with Arthur Conan Doyle's fictional detective in Mr Holmes is nothing short of magnificent ... Director Bill Condon, who teamed superbly with McKellen on the Oscar-winning Gods and Monsters, brings us a riveting character study of a lion not going gentle into winter". In October 2015, McKellen appeared as Norman to Anthony Hopkins's Sir in a BBC Two production of Ronald Harwood's The Dresser, alongside Edward Fox, Vanessa Kirby, and Emily Watson. Television critic Tim Goodman of The Hollywood Reporter praised the film and the central performances writing, "there's no escaping that Hopkins and McKellen are the central figures here, giving wonderfully nuanced performances, onscreen together for their first time in their acclaimed careers". For his performance McKellen received a British Academy Television Award nomination for his performance.

In 2017, McKellen portrayed in a supporting role as Cogsworth (originally voiced by David Ogden Stiers in the 1991 animated film) in the live-action adaptation of Disney's Beauty and the Beast, directed by Bill Condon (which marked the third collaboration between Condon and McKellen, after Gods and Monsters and Mr. Holmes) and co-starred alongside Emma Watson and Dan Stevens. The film was released to positive reviews and grossed $1.2 billion worldwide, making it the highest-grossing live-action musical film, the second highest-grossing film of 2017, and the 17th highest-grossing film of all time. In 2017, McKellen appeared in the documentary McKellen: Playing the Part, directed by director Joe Stephenson. The documentary explores McKellen's life and career as an actor.

In October 2017, McKellen played King Lear at the Chichester Festival Theatre, a role that he said was likely to be his "last big Shakespearean part". He performed the play at the Duke of York's Theatre in London's West End during the summer of 2018. McKellen voiced Dr. Cecil Pritchfield the child psychiatrist for Stewie Griffin in the Family Guy episode "Send in Stewie, Please" in 2018. He appeared in Kenneth Branagh's historical drama All is True (2018) portraying Henry Wriothesley, 3rd Earl of Southampton, opposite Branagh and Judi Dench. Peter Bradshaw of The Guardian wrote that Judi Dench and he "offer solid support" and added that his role is a "colossal, emphatically wigged cameo". To celebrate his 80th birthday, in 2019 McKellen performed in a one-man stage show titled Ian McKellen on Stage: With Tolkien, Shakespeare, Others and YOU celebrating the various performances throughout his career. The show toured across the UK and Ireland (raising money for each venue and organisation's charity) before a West End run at the Harold Pinter Theatre and was performed for one night only on Broadway at the Hudson Theatre.

In 2019, he reunited with Condon for a fourth time in the mystery thriller The Good Liar opposite Helen Mirren, who received praise for their onscreen chemistry. That same year, he appeared as Gus the Theatre Cat in the movie musical adaptation of Cats directed by Tom Hooper. The film featured performances from Jennifer Hudson, James Corden, Rebel Wilson, Idris Elba, and Judi Dench. The film was widely panned for its poor visual effects, editing, performances, screenplay, and was a box office disaster. In 2021, he played the title role in an age-blind production of Hamlet (having previously played the part in a UK and European tour in 1971), followed by the role of Firs in Chekov's The Cherry Orchard at the Theatre Royal, Windsor. Since November 2021, McKellen and ABBA member Björn Ulvaeus have posted Instagram videos featuring the pair knitting Christmas jumpers and other festive attire. In 2023, it was revealed that Ulvaeus and McKellen would be knitting stagewear for Kylie Minogue as part of her More Than Just a Residency concert residency at Voltaire at The Venetian Las Vegas.

In 2023, he starred in the period thriller The Critic directed by Anand Tucker. The film is written by Patrick Marber adapted off the 2015 novel Curtain Call by Anthony Quinn. The film premiered at the 2023 Toronto International Film Festival.

In April 2024, McKellen starred as John Falstaff in Player Kings (an adaptation of Shakespeare's Henry IV Parts 1 and 2) opposite Richard Coyle and Toheeb Jimoh at the Noël Coward Theatre in London's West End and received rave reviews (following runs at New Wimbledon Theatre and Manchester Opera House). The production was scheduled to run until 22 June before touring to Bristol, Birmingham, Norwich and Newcastle upon Tyne, however during the performance on 17 June, McKellen fell off the front of the stage during a fight scene and called for assistance; the performance was cancelled and the audience dismissed. He was later reported to have recovered and to be "in good spirits." He subsequently pulled out of the remaining West End and tour performances on medical advice.

By early 2025, he resumed his activities with a starring role in The Christophers, a black comedy directed by Steven Soderbergh.

The 2025 Christmas pantomime at the Pleasance Theatre, Islington, features a cameo appearance on video of McKellen as the dog Toto in The Wonderful Wizard of Oz-lington, a show derived from Wicked and The Wizard of Oz.

McKellen is set to reprise his role as Magneto in Avengers: Doomsday (2026). He is also attached to return as Gandalf in the Andy Serkis directed The Hunt for Gollum (2027).

== Personal life ==
In 1964, McKellen began a relationship with his first romantic partner, Brian Taylor, a history teacher from Bolton. They lived in Earls Terrace, Kensington, London, and their relationship ended in 1972. In 1978, McKellen met his second partner, Sean Mathias, at the Edinburgh Festival. This relationship lasted until 1988, and according to Mathias, it was tempestuous, with conflicts over McKellen's success in acting versus Mathias's somewhat less-successful career. The two remained friends, with Mathias later directing McKellen in Waiting for Godot at the Theatre Royal Haymarket in 2009. The pair entered into a business partnership with Evgeny Lebedev, purchasing the lease of The Grapes pub in Narrow Street, Limehouse, London. As of 2005, McKellen had been living on Narrow Street for more than 25 years.

McKellen is an atheist. In the late 1980s, he lost his appetite for every kind of meat but fish, and began following a mainly pescetarian diet. He has a tattoo on his shoulder of the number 9 in J. R. R. Tolkien's constructed script of Tengwar, a reference to McKellen's Lord of the Rings character Gandalf being one of the nine companions of the Fellowship of the Ring. Except for John Rhys-Davies, all of the other actors of the Fellowship—Elijah Wood, Sean Astin, Orlando Bloom, Billy Boyd, Sean Bean, Dominic Monaghan and Viggo Mortensen—have the same tattoo.

McKellen was diagnosed with prostate cancer in 2006. In 2012, he wrote on his blog that the cancer was contained and that he had not needed any treatment. The following year, McKellen officiated the wedding of his friend and X-Men co-star Patrick Stewart, who was marrying the singer Sunny Ozell.

== Activism ==
=== LGBT rights ===
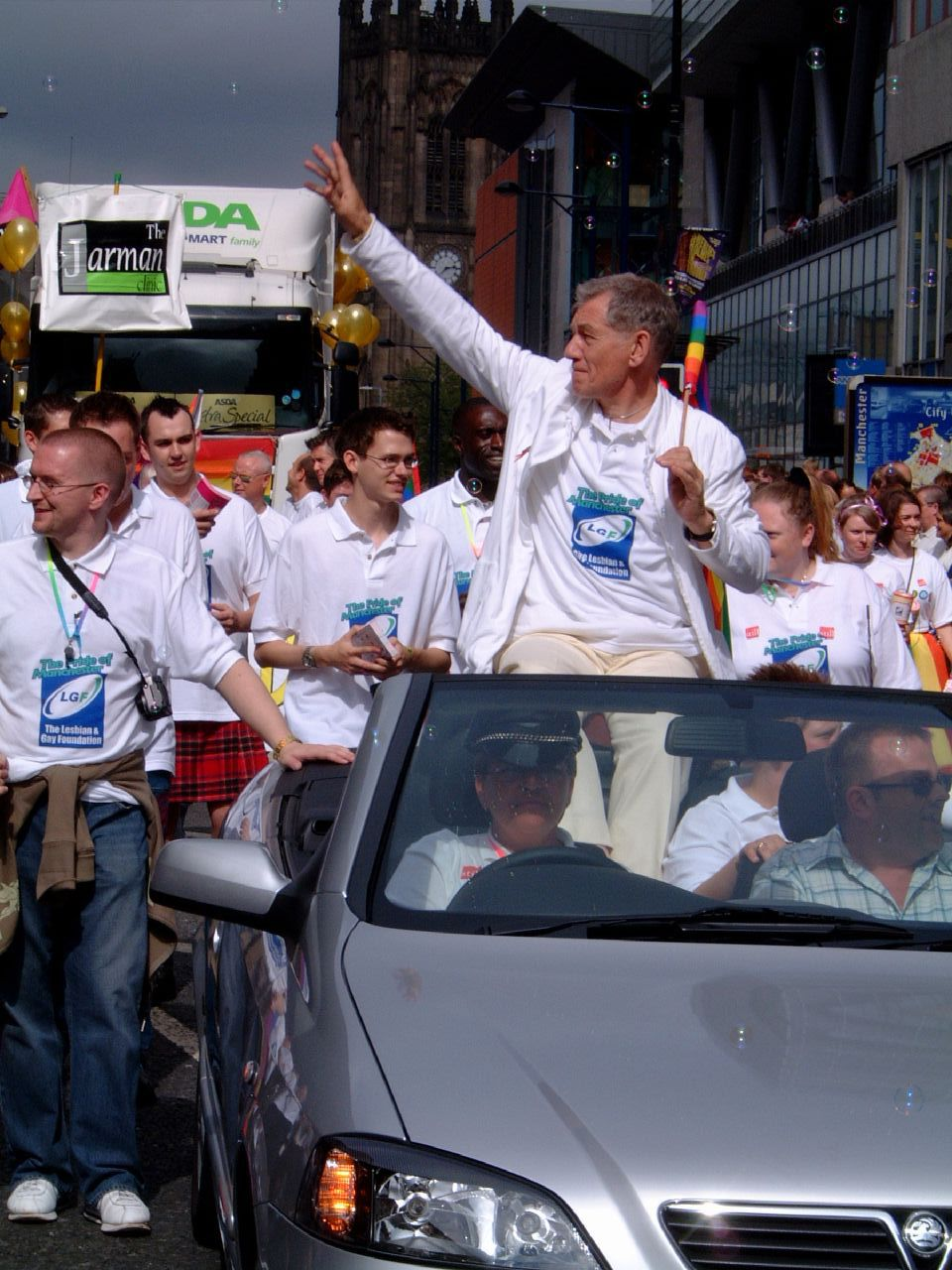
McKellen at Europride 2003 in Manchester

McKellen shared his sexual orientation with fellow actors early in his stage career. In 1988, he publicly came out as gay to protest the proposed Section 28 of the Local Government Act 1988, which would make illegal the public "promotion of homosexuality." (Note: Attributed to multiple references:) His decision was influenced by his friends, among them the gay author Armistead Maupin. He hoped that coming out would inspire others to oppose the law.

In 2003, during an appearance on Have I Got News For You, McKellen claimed when he visited Michael Howard, then Environment Secretary in 1988 to lobby against Section 28, Howard refused to change his position but did ask him to leave an autograph for his children. McKellen agreed, but wrote, "Fuck off, I'm gay". McKellen described Howard's junior ministers, Conservatives David Wilshire and Jill Knight, who were the architects of Section 28, as the 'ugly sisters' of a political pantomime.

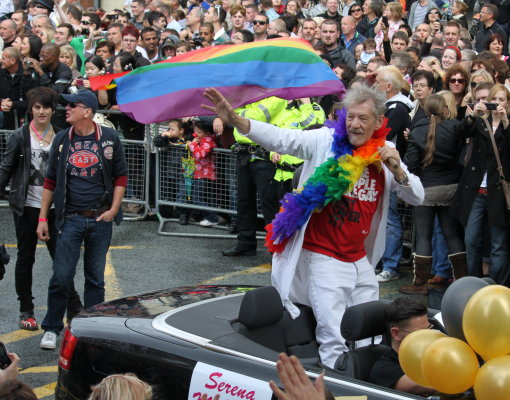
McKellen at Manchester Pride 2010

McKellen has continued to be very active in LGBT rights efforts. In a statement on his website regarding his activism, the actor commented:

I have been reluctant to lobby on other issues I most care about—nuclear weapons (against), religion (atheist), capital punishment (anti), AIDS (fund-raiser) because I never want to be forever spouting, diluting the impact of addressing my most urgent concern: legal and social equality for gay people worldwide.

McKellen is a co-founder of Stonewall, an LGBT rights lobby group in the United Kingdom, named after the Stonewall riots. McKellen is also patron of LGBT History Month, Pride London, Oxford Pride, GAY-GLOS, LGBT Foundation, and FFLAG where he appears in their video "Parents Talking".

In 1994, at the closing ceremony of the Gay Games, he briefly took the stage to address the crowd, saying, "I'm Sir Ian McKellen, but you can call me Serena": This nickname, given to him by Stephen Fry, had been circulating within the gay community since McKellen's knighthood was conferred. In 2002, he was the Celebrity Grand Marshal of the San Francisco Pride Parade and he attended the Academy Awards with his then-boyfriend, New Zealander Nick Cuthell. In 2006, McKellen spoke at the pre-launch of the 2007 LGBT History Month in the UK, lending his support to the organisation and its founder, Sue Sanders. In 2007, he became a patron of The Albert Kennedy Trust, an organisation that provides support to young, homeless and troubled LGBT people.

In 2006, he became a patron of Oxford Pride.

McKellen has taken his activism internationally, and caused a major stir in Singapore, where he was invited to do an interview on a morning show and shocked the interviewer by asking if they could recommend him a gay bar; the programme immediately ended. In December 2008, he was named in Out's annual Out 100 list.

In 2010, McKellen extended his support for Liverpool's Homotopia festival in which a group of gay and lesbian Merseyside teenagers helped to produce an anti-homophobia campaign pack for schools and youth centres across the city. In May 2011, he called Sergey Sobyanin, Moscow's mayor, a "coward" for refusing to allow gay parades in the city.

In 2014, he was named in the top 10 on the World Pride Power list.

=== Charity work ===
In April 2010, along with actors Brian Cox and Eleanor Bron, McKellen appeared in a series of TV advertisements to support Age UK, the charity recently formed from the merger of Age Concern and Help the Aged. All three actors gave their time free of charge.

A cricket fan since childhood, McKellen umpired in March 2011 for a charity cricket match in New Zealand to support earthquake victims of the February 2011 Christchurch earthquake.

McKellen is an honorary board member for the New York City- and Washington, D.C.–based organisation Only Make Believe. Only Make Believe creates and performs interactive plays in children's hospitals and care facilities. He was honoured by the organisation in 2012 and hosted their annual Make Believe on Broadway Gala in November 2013.

McKellen also has a history of supporting individual theatres. While in New Zealand filming The Hobbit in 2012, he announced a special New Zealand tour "Shakespeare, Tolkien and You!", with proceeds going to help save the Isaac Theatre Royal, which suffered extensive damage during the 2011 Christchurch earthquake. McKellen said he opted to help save the building as it was the last theatre he played in New Zealand (Waiting for Godot in 2010) and the locals' love for it made it a place worth supporting. In July 2017, he performed a new one-man show for a week at Park Theatre (London), donating the proceeds to the theatre.

Together with a number of his Lord of the Rings co-stars (plus writer Philippa Boyens and director Peter Jackson), on 1 June 2020 McKellen joined Josh Gad's YouTube series Reunited Apart which reunites the cast of popular movies through video-conferencing, and promotes donations to non-profit charities.

=== Other work ===
A friend of Ian Charleson and an admirer of his work, McKellen contributed an entire chapter to For Ian Charleson: A Tribute. A recording of McKellen's voice is heard before performances at the Royal Festival Hall, reminding patrons to ensure their mobile phones and watch alarms are switched off and to keep coughing to a minimum. He took part in the 2012 Summer Paralympics opening ceremony in London as Prospero from Shakespeare's The Tempest.

== Accolades and honours ==
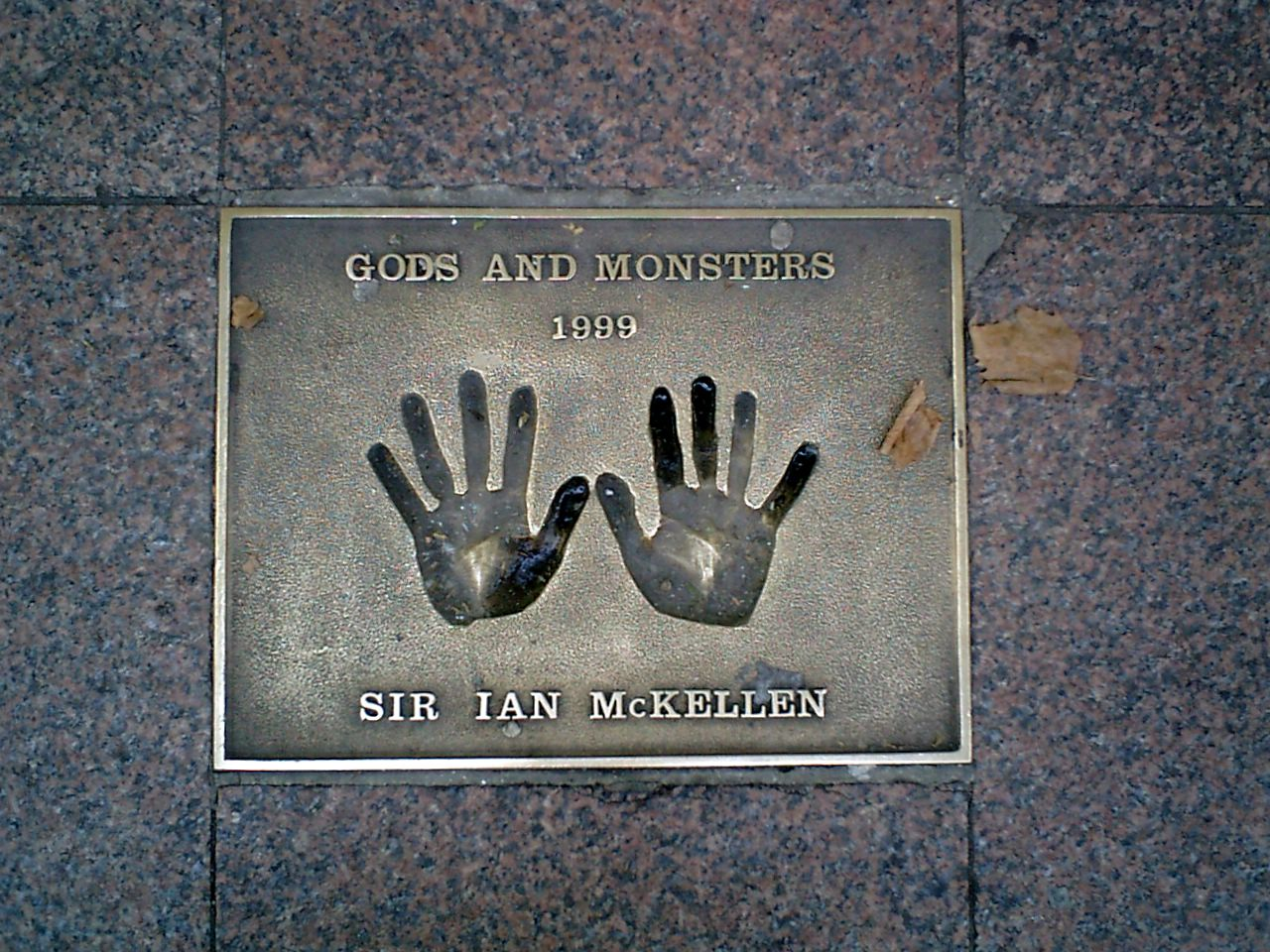
The hands of McKellen on a 1999 Gods and Monsters plaque in London's Leicester Square

McKellen has received two Academy Award nominations for his performances in Gods and Monsters (1999), and The Lord of the Rings: The Fellowship of the Ring (2001). He has received five Primetime Emmy Award nominations. McKellen has received two Tony Award nominations, winning for Best Actor in a Play for his performance in Amadeus in 1981. He has received 12 Olivier Award nominations, winning six awards for his performances in Pillars of the Community (1977), The Alchemist (1978), Bent (1979), Wild Honey (1984), Richard III (1991), and Ian McKellen on Stage: With Tolkien, Shakespeare, Others and YOU (2020).

He has received many honorary awards, including Pride International Film Festival's Lifetime Achievement & Distinction Award in 2004 and the Olivier Awards' Society Special Award in 2006. He received The Lebedev Special Award in the 2009 Evening Standard Theatre Awards. The following year he received the Empire Awards' Empire Icon Award. In 2017 he received the Honorary Award from the Istanbul International Film Festival. McKellen was awarded an Honorary Fellowship of the British Shakespeare Association in 2020.

In 2001, McKellen received the Artist Citizen of the World (Artiste Citoyen du Monde) Award from the Institut Citoyen du Cinéma in France.

McKellen was appointed a Commander of the Order of the British Empire (CBE) in the 1979 Birthday Honours, then knighted in the 1991 New Year Honours for services to the performing arts, and made a Member of the Order of the Companions of Honour (CH) in the 2008 New Year Honours for services to drama and to equality.

He was awarded an honorary Doctorate of Letters (Hon LittD) by the University of Cambridge on 18 June 2014. He is an emeritus Fellow of St Catherine's College, Oxford. He was awarded the Freedom of the City of London on 30 October 2014. The ceremony took place at Guildhall in London. He was nominated by London's Lord Mayor Fiona Woolf, who said he was an "exceptional actor" and "tireless campaigner for equality".

== See also ==
- List of British actors
- List of Royal National Theatre Company actors
- List of actors in Royal Shakespeare Company productions
- List of Academy Award winners and nominees from Great Britain
- List of actors with Academy Award nominations
- List of actors with more than one Academy Award nomination in the acting categories
- List of LGBTQ Academy Award winners and nominees
- List of Golden Globe winners
- List of atheists in film, radio, television and theatre

== Sources ==
- Barratt, Mark (2006). Ian McKellen: An Unofficial Biography. London: Virgin Books. ISBN 978-0-7535-1074-2.
