= King Lear (2008 film) =

- Written by: William Shakespeare
- Directed by: Trevor Nunn
- Starring: Ian McKellen; Romola Garai; Frances Barber; Jonathan Hyde; Sylvester McCoy
- Country of origin: United Kingdom
- Original language: English

Production
- Producer: Paul Wheeler
- Cinematography: Paul Wheeler
- Running time: 181 minutes

Original release
- Network: More4
- Release: 26 December 2008

King Lear is a 2008 television film based on the William Shakespeare play of the same name, directed by Trevor Nunn. It was broadcast on More4 in the UK on Christmas Day, and shown on PBS' Great Performances in the United States in March 2009. The production was filmed mainly at Pinewood Studios in England.

It features the same cast and director as the 2007 RSC production, and started filming only a few days after the final performance at the New London Theatre, at Pinewood Studios in Buckinghamshire. The film was released on DVD in the UK and then in the US on 21 April 2009. It was shown on Channel 4 on 26 December 2008, as well as being broadcast on PBS in 2009 and a number of other TV stations internationally, including NHK Japan.

== Cast and crew ==
=== Cast ===
- Ian McKellen as King Lear
- Romola Garai as Cordelia
- William Gaunt as Earl of Gloucester
- Jonathan Hyde as Earl of Kent
- Philip Winchester as Edmund
- Sylvester McCoy as The Fool
- Frances Barber as Goneril
- Monica Dolan as Regan
- David Weston as A Gentleman
- Guy Williams as Duke of Cornwall
- Seymour Matthews as Curan
- John Heffernan as Oswald
- Ben Meyjes as Edgar
- Julian Harries as Duke of Albany
- Naomi Capron as Maid
- Kieran Bew as Soldier
- Peter Hinton as Duke of Burgundy
- Ben Addis as King of France

=== Crew ===
- Director – Trevor Nunn
- Producer – Richard Price
- Line Producer – Andy Picheta
- Cinematographer – Paul Wheeler

== Production history ==
King Lear started filming only a few days after the final stage performance on 12 January 2008. Filming at Pinewood Studios lasted for around a month.

Whilst McKellen appeared fully nude in the original production, PBS would not allow this on screen, so he appeared only partially nude in the televised production.

== See also ==
- King Lear – Original Production History
