= Pride International Film Festival =

LGBTQ film festival in the Philippines

Pride International Film Festival (PIFF) is an international LGBT film festival which advocates HIV and AIDS awareness and education through films and videos. The first festival, originally planned for 2003, took place on August 21, 2004, in Manila, Philippines. Organized by founder Severino Planas, it was established to help in its worldwide endeavor of fighting HIV/AIDS and promoting prevention and control.

"The fight is our fight," these were the words of Fernando Josef, vice president and artistic director of the Cultural Center of the Philippines (CCP), at the opening of the 2004 Pride International Film Festival (PIFF) at the CCP Dream Theater (Tanghalang Manuel Conde) in Manila.

Josef emphasized the institution's support "to uplift and empower the gay, lesbian, bisexual, and transgender in our society, [and] to enlighten others about the issues and concerns affecting this often marginalized, if not discriminated against sector."

The festival presented its "Judy" Award (Most Influential Person in the World) to Madonna and the "Lifetime Achievement and Distinction" Award to Sir Ian McKellen. Both awards were presented in-absentia.

== See also ==
- List of LGBT film festivals
