= Wild Honey (play) =

1984 play by Michael Frayn

Wild Honey is a 1984 adaptation by British playwright Michael Frayn of an earlier play by Anton Chekhov. The original work, a sprawling five-hour drama from Chekhov's earliest years as a writer, has no title, but is usually known in English as Platonov, after its principal character "Mikhail Platonov", a disillusioned provincial schoolmaster.

Frayn's adaptation was given its first production at London's National Theatre in 1984 and won Olivier Awards in three categories: for Ian McKellen as Actor of the Year in a Revival, Christopher Morahan as Director of the Year and John Gunter as Designer of the Year. "Anna Petrovna" was played by Charlotte Cornwell.

The play opened at New York's Virginia Theatre in December 1986 presented by impresario Douglas Urbanski with McKellen repeating his title role, but otherwise with an American cast which included Kim Cattrall, Kathryn Walker and Kate Burton.

The play was broadcast as a radio play on the digital radio station, BBC7 on 31 January 2010 as part of a BBC radio season of documentaries, drama, short stories and essays to celebrate the 150th anniversary of Chekhov's birthday. Ian McKellen returned to play Platonov, while Anna Calder Marshall played Sasha. BBC Radio 4 broadcast another production in 2018, directed by Clive Brill, starring David Tennant as Platonov and Olivia Darnley as Sasha.

== Awards and nominations ==
=== Original London production ===
Year	Award	Category	Nominee	Result
1984	Laurence Olivier Awards	Actor of the Year in a Revival	Ian McKellen	Won
1984	Laurence Olivier Awards	Best Director	Christopher Morahan	Won
1984	Laurence Olivier Awards	Best Set Design	John Gunter	Won

=== Original Broadway production ===
Year	Award	Category	Nominee	Result
1987	Drama Desk Award	Outstanding Play		Nominated
1987	Drama Desk Award	Outstanding Actor in a Play	Ian McKellen	Nominated
1987	Drama Desk Award	Outstanding Lighting Design	Martin Aronstein	Nominated
1987	Drama Desk Award	Outstanding Set Design	John Gunter	Nominated
1987	Tony Award	Best Lighting Design	Martin Aronstein	Nominated
