= The Wood Demon (play) =

Play by Anton Chekhov

- Original language: Russian
- Written by: Anton Chekhov

Premiere
- Date: 1889

The Wood Demon or Leshy (Russian: Леший, romanized: Leshy, 1889) is a comedic play in four acts by Anton Chekhov.

Written in September and October 1889, it was totally reworked in December, and premiered on December 27, 1889 at the private Abramova Theatre in Moscow. This second version of The Wood Demon was completed in April 1890 and received the permission to be staged by Imperial Theatres in May. It was published by the Rassokhin Publishers on 23 August 1890.

The play was first refused by the Alexandrinsky Theatre of Saint Petersburg and the Maly Theatre of Moscow.

Eight years after this play failed, Chekhov returned to the work. He reduced the cast list by half, changed the climactic suicide into an anti-climax of a failed homicide, and published the reworked play, much more successfully, under the title Uncle Vanya.

== Characters ==
- Alexander Serebryakov, a retired professor
- Helena, his wife of 27 years old
- Sofia Alexandrovna (Sonya), his daughter from his first marriage, 20 years old
- Mary V. Wynn, widow of a privy councilor, the mother of the first wife of professor
- Egor P. Wynn, her son
- Leonid S. Zheltukhin, unfinished student of technology, a very rich man
- Julia Stepanovna, his sister, 18 years old
- Ivan Orlov, a landowner
- Fedor, his son
- Michael L. Khrushchev, a landowner, he graduated at the Faculty of Medicine
- Ilya Ilyich Dyadin
- Basil, a servant of Zheltukhin
- Simon, an employee at the mill

== Themes ==
A dominant theme in The Wood Demon is that destruction of the environment and of people's lives are closely linked together.

== History ==
The play was initially a collaboration between Chekhov and Alexey Suvorin. As such, it is full of biographical material collected during their time spent together in the summer of 1888. The play is linked with stories already written or in the process of being written, that stemmed from Chekhov's journey in 1887 to Kharkov and Taganrog.

== Reception ==
The failure of The Wood Demon was one of the motivations for Chekhov's journey through Siberia and why he abstained from writing a play for the next seven years after which he rose to fame.
