= Acting Shakespeare =

- Original language: English
- Written by: Ian McKellen & William Shakespeare
- Genre: One man show

Premiere
- Date: 3 March 1980
- Place: National Museum of Denmark

Acting Shakespeare is a one-man show of Shakespearean monologues interspersed with theatrical anecdotes devised and performed by Ian McKellen. McKellen first performed the recital in Scandinavia in 1980 and later performed it throughout the world. It was broadcast by PBS in 1982. For the 1984 Broadway engagement, McKellen received the Drama Desk Award for Outstanding One-Person Show and a Tony Award nomination. He received internationally rave reviews with some calling him "The new Olivier" and "The greatest classical actor of our generation". The most recent performance was in Jersey Opera House in 1990, until its revival in 2022 by the Irvington Shakespeare Company.

In 1993 McKellen developed another version of this one-man show, 'A Knight Out' (using the play on word as a result of his being knighted in 1991) but this time focusing, as well as on stage roles, on his now ever-increasing film roles. As with Acting Shakespeare, he toured around England, Europe and America to great acclaim.

A predecessor of this show's format was John Gielgud's The Ages of Man, which consisted of Gielgud in front of an audience with a mixture of both speeches and anecdotes.

In 2022, actor Kamran Saliani and the Irvington Shakespeare Company were granted special permission from Sir Ian McKellen to revive the show in the Lower Hudson Valley region of New York, in a co-production with the Irvington Theater.
