= Pielmeier =

Pielmeier is a surname. Notable people with the surname include:

- John Pielmeier (born 1949), American playwright and screenwriter
- Timo Pielmeier (born 1989), German ice hockey goaltender
