= Bent (play) =

1979 play by Martin Sherman

- Poster for the Royal National Theatre's 1990 revival of Bent, starring Ian McKellen
- Original language: English
- Written by: Martin Sherman
- Subject: Persecution of homosexuals in Nazi Germany
- Setting: Berlin, 1934 following the Night of the Long Knives

Premiere
- Date: 3 May 1979
- Place: Royal Court Theatre, London

Bent (sometimes stylised as BENT) is a 1979 stage play written by Martin Sherman. It revolves around the persecution of gay people in Nazi Germany, taking place during and after the Night of the Long Knives.

The title of the play refers to the slang word "bent" used to refer to homosexuals. When the play was first performed, there was only a trickle of historical research or even awareness about the Nazi persecution of homosexuals. In some regards, the play helped increase that historical research and education in the 1980s and 1990s.

== Plot ==
Maximilian Berber (Max), a promiscuous gay man in 1930s Berlin, is at odds with his wealthy family because of his homosexuality. One evening, much to the resentment of his boyfriend Rudolph Hennings (Rudy), he brings home a handsome Sturmabteilung man, Wolfgang Granz (Wolf). Unfortunately, it is the night that Hitler orders the assassination of the upper echelon of the Sturmabteilung corps, to consolidate his power. Wolf is discovered the next morning and killed by SS men in Max and Rudy's apartment, and the two have to flee their home.

They seek counsel from Rudy's boss Greta. Greta is a drag queen; she ran her own gay club, which is newly shut down (implicitly due to, at the time, new Paragraph 175 enforcements). Greta explains that the SS approached her for information about Wolf, and that she took them to Max and Rudy's apartment. She officially fires Rudy and hands Max the finder's fee she earned from the SS. They leave the club and Berlin behind.

Max's uncle Freddie, who is also gay, but lives a more discreet life with rent boys to satisfy his desires, has organized new papers for Max to flee to France where homosexuality is legal, but Max refuses to leave Rudy behind. As a result, Max and Rudy are found in a forest tent-colony and arrested by the Gestapo. They are forced to board a train headed for Dachau concentration camp.

On the train, Rudy is spotted wearing glasses by an officer. The officer makes Rudy crush his glasses, and then orders Rudy to be taken, presumably to be killed for his poor eyesight. Rudy is beaten within an inch of his life, all the while Max tries to ignore his screams. Another prisoner on the train, wearing a pink triangle patch, explains the patch system during the Holocaust to Max and tells Max that he must show no sentiment towards Rudy. The officer has Rudy taken back to Max and coerces Max to beat Rudy to death. Max is taken by the guards and lies to them, telling them that he is a Jew rather than a homosexual, because he believes his chances for survival in the camp will be better if he is not assigned the pink triangle. Max later confesses, to the same prisoner from the train, that the guards then forced him to have intercourse with the body of a dead pre-teen girl to "prove" he was not homosexual. That prisoner reveals their name is Horst.

In the camp, Max makes friends with Horst, who shows him the dignity that lies in acknowledging what one is. They fall in love and become lovers through their imagination and through their words. After Horst is shot by camp guards, Max puts on Horst's jacket with the pink triangle and commits suicide by grabbing an electric fence.

== Premiere ==
Bent premiered in May 1979 at the Royal Court Theatre in Sloane Square, London, the production transferring that July to the Criterion Theatre in the West End.

The first cast was

- Ian McKellen as Max
- Tom Bell as Horst
- Jeff Rawle as Rudy
- Peter Cellier as the Captain
- Richard Gale as Freddie
- Jeremy Arnold as the 2nd Lieutenant
- Ken Shorter as Greta
- John Francis as the Corporal

== Subsequent production history ==
- 1979 – Broadway – The play was directed by Robert Allan Ackerman, with scenery by Santo Loquasto, costumes by Robert Wojewodski, lighting by Arden Fingerhut, and music by Stanley Silverman. The production featured Richard Gere as Max, David Marshall Grant as Rudy, James Remar as Wolf, Michael Gross as Greta, George Hall as Uncle Freddie, Bryan E. Clark as Officer, David Dukes as Horst, Ron Randell as Captain, and the Guards were Kai Wulff, Philip Kraus, and John Snyder.
- 1980 – Bent was premièred in French at Le Théâtre de Poche in Brussels (Belgium) in January 1980, in a French translation by Lena Grinda, directed by Derek Goldby, with Alain Libolt, Jean-Pierre Dauzun, Yves Deguenne, Pierre Dumaine, Fabrice Eberhard, Bernard Graczyk, Thomas Hutereau, Jean Couvrin, Tobias Kempf, and Roland Mahauden. There was a rerun in September 1998.
- 1980 – In April the play was staged in Germany for the first time at the Nationaltheater in Mannheim
- 1981 – The first production in Brazil was in 1981, at Teatro Villa Lobos (Rio de Janeiro) with José Mayer (Max), Tonico Pereira (Horst), Ricardo Blat (Rudy), and Paulo César Grande. In spite of the fact that Brazil was then a military dictatorship, Sherman's text was presented uncensored.
- 1981 – The first Canadian production of Bent was in 1981 at the Bathurst Street Theatre, Toronto, Ontario, in English; it starred Richard Monette as Max, Brent Carver as Horst and Jeff Wincott as Wolf/Kapo.
- 1983 – In Israel, the play was first produced in 1983, and has since been revived on five occasions, most recently in 2018, at the Israeli National Habima Theatre. It reportedly caused riots in Israel, due to the controversial subject matter.
- 1984 – Bent was staged in April of 1984 at the University of Alabama at Birmingham, featuring Kiel Martin as Max. Martin was at the time co-starring as Detective J. D. LaRue on NBC's Emmy-winning police procedural Hill Street Blues.
- 1989 – Sean Mathias directed a revival of the play, performed as a one-night benefit for Stonewall, featuring Ian McKellen, Richard E Grant, Ian Charleson, and Ralph Fiennes. After receiving critical acclaim the one-night revival, Mathias directed a full run at the National Theatre in January 1990, with McKellen, Paul Rhys, and Christopher Eccleston, which won the City Limits Award for Revival of the Year.
- 2003 – Bent was presented by Singaporean theatre company Toy Factory Theatre Ensemble, directed by Beatrice Chia.
- 2009 – Bent was presented in Amarillo, Texas by AVENUE 10, causing the theater to be targeted by an anti-homosexual Christian group Repent Amarillo, who shut down the venue by tipping off local law enforcement.
- 2015 – A Polish production in a translation by Rubi Birden premiered in Warsaw Teatr Dramatyczny on 2 October 2015 starring Mariusz Drężek, Kamil Siegmund, Piotr Bulcewicz, Piotr Siwkiewicz, and Maciej Wyczański.
- 2022 – Bent, produced by Independent Theatre in Adelaide, South Australia, directed by Rob Croser and starring Matt Hyde as Max

== Film adaptation ==
In 1997, Sherman adapted Bent into a film of the same name, directed by Sean Mathias. The film featured Clive Owen as Max, Lothaire Bluteau as Horst, and Ian McKellen as Freddie.
