= Sean Mathias =

Welsh actor, director, and writer (born 1956)

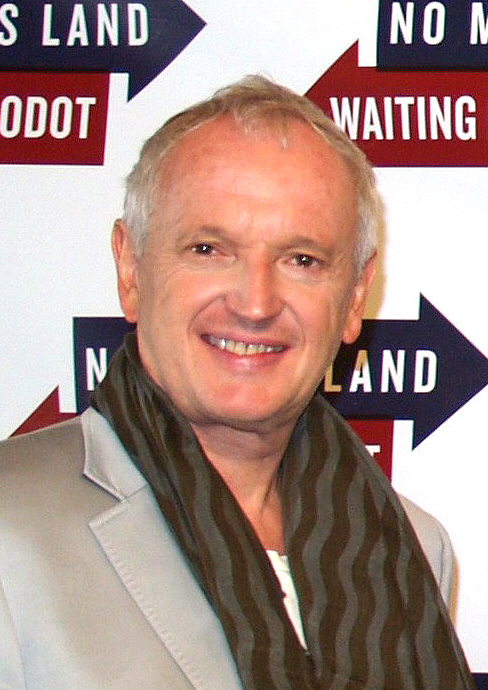
- Mathias in 2013
- Born: Sean Gerard Mathias; 14 March 1956 (age 70); Swansea, Wales
- Occupations: Actor, director, writer
- Years active: 1977–present
- Spouse: Paul de Lange (m. 2007)
- Partner: Ian McKellen (1978–1988)

Sean Gerard Mathias (born 14 March 1956) is a Welsh actor, director, and writer. He is known for directing the films Bent and Frank and Percy and for directing highly acclaimed theatre productions in London, New York, Johannesburg, Cape Town, Los Angeles and Sydney.

He was included in the 2006 list of the 101 most influential gay and lesbian people in Britain in the Independent on Sunday's Pink List. Mathias is co-owner of The Grapes, Limehouse pub along with business partners Ian McKellen, Evgeny Lebedev and Paul De Lange since September 2011.

== Career ==
=== Actor ===
Mathias began his acting career by appearing on the television screen in a small role on an episode of the cult BBC TV series Survivors, in 1977. Also in 1977, he played an Irish Guards lieutenant in the film A Bridge Too Far.

In 1978, Mathias appeared in a production at the Edinburgh Festival Fringe, during which time he met actor Ian McKellen who subsequently became his partner of about nine years.

Mathias' acting career continued into the 1980s with minor appearances on TV and in films such as Priest of Love (1981), which starred McKellen as D. H. Lawrence, and The Scarlet Pimpernel (1982), starring Anthony Andrews, Jane Seymour and McKellen. He made one notable appearance in the 1988 film White Mischief as Gerald Portman.

Another notable TV appearance was on the TV show Minder in 1982. The episode was entitled "Broken Arrow" and, in it, Mathias played the part of a young darts player named Dafydd.

=== Writer ===
Mathias's play Cowardice was produced at the Ambassadors Theatre in London in August 1983, starring Ian McKellen, Janet Suzman and Nigel Davenport and received poor reviews from most critics with the exception of Harold Hobson who gave the play a rave review and likened Mathias's debut to that of Pinter's. He followed it with Infidelities, which premiered at the Edinburgh Festival Fringe in 1985 before transferring to London's Donmar Warehouse.

In 1987, A Prayer For Wings, directed by Joan Plowright, was produced in Edinburgh and, after winning a Fringe First award, transferred to the Bush Theatre in London. Later plays include Poor Nanny in 1989, and Swansea Boys in 1990.

His writing also includes a novel, Manhattan Mourning, published in 1988, and the BBC TV film The Lost Language of Cranes, adapted from the novel by David Leavitt. Starring Brian Cox and Eileen Atkins it was broadcast in 1992.

In 2024 Mathias adapted Shakespeare's Hamlet into a screenplay for a movie he directed. In 2025 Mathias directed Swansea Boy, a play he had previously workshopped at the National Theatre several decades earlier.

A close friend of Ian Charleson, whom he also directed in Bent, Mathias contributed a chapter to the 1990 book, For Ian Charleson: A Tribute.

=== Theatre director ===
Mathias' career as a theatre director began in 1988 with Exceptions.

In 1989, he directed a revival of Bent at the Adelphi Theatre, the award-winning play by Martin Sherman that had opened at the Royal Court Theatre in 1979 starring McKellen. Performed as a benefit, that performance featured McKellen, Richard E Grant, Ian Charleson and Ralph Fiennes. After receiving critical acclaim, Mathias directed a full run in 1990 at the National Theatre with McKellen alongside Paul Rhys and Christopher Eccleston, winning the City Limits Award for Revival of the Year.

Mathias went on to direct plays both in London and on Broadway, including Pam Gems' adaptation of Chekhov's Uncle Vanya with McKellen and Antony Sher and Janet McTeer in 1992 at the Royal National Theatre; Alan Bennett's Talking Heads with McKellen and Imelda Staunton, and Noel and Gertie starring Patricia Hodge and Edward Petherbridge.

He received the 1994 Critics Circle Theatre Award for Best Director for Noël Coward's Design for Living (with Rachel Weisz, Clive Owen, Paul Rhys and Rupert Graves) and Jean Cocteau's Les Parents terribles, starring Sheila Gish, Frances de la Tour, Alan Howard and Jude Law. The latter transferred to the Ethel Barrymore Theatre on Broadway in April 1995 as Indiscretions, with Law joined by Kathleen Turner, Eileen Atkins, Roger Rees and Cynthia Nixon. It earned nine Tony Award nominations including Best Director of a Play.

Mathias directed his first Stephen Sondheim musical, A Little Night Music, at the National Theatre in October 1995, with Judi Dench and Siân Phillips and Patricia Hodge. He had worked with Phillips before, directing her in another Pam Gems adaptation, Henrik Ibsen's Ghosts at the Sherman Theatre in Cardiff in 1993. Mathias worked with Siân Phillips again in 1997, directing her as Marlene Dietrich in Marlene, which transferred to Broadway in 1999 and received two Tony Award nominations.

Other London directorial credits include Antony and Cleopatra, starring Alan Rickman and Helen Mirren, in 1998, and Tennessee Williams' Suddenly Last Summer with Sheila Gish and Rachel Weisz in April to July 1999 at the Comedy Theatre.

Mathias' career then moved to New York, where, in October 2001, he directed McKellen and Helen Mirren in August Strindberg's Dance of Death on Broadway. He went on to direct this in London and Sydney in 2003. Also, in March 2001, he directed an Off-Broadway production of Servicemen by Evan Smith. He followed this in April 2002 with a Broadway revival of The Elephant Man starring Billy Crudup at the Royale Theatre.

In 2002, he returned to Sondheim to direct Company at the Kennedy Center Eisenhower Theater in Washington, D.C. in 2002, as part of its Sondheim Celebration, with a cast including John Barrowman and Lynn Redgrave. Speaking to the Stephen Sondheim Society at the time, he said: "I always wanted to do Company; it's the first musical I ever fell in love with." As a youngster in South Wales, Mathias said, he used to listen to the original Broadway recording of the show and sing "The Ladies Who Lunch" with friends: "I couldn't believe the songs, the cynicism, the sexuality."

For the 2004 Christmas season, Mathias directed the pantomime Aladdin at the Old Vic in London, with McKellen as Widow Twankey alongside Maureen Lipman, Roger Allam and Joe McFadden. Due to its huge success, Mathias reunited with McKellen and Allam for a second run the following Christmas, with Frances Barber in the cast.

In 2005, Mathias directed Rebecca Lenkiewicz's Shoreditch Madonna at the Soho Theatre in London, starring Francesca Annis and Leigh Lawson. He returned to the US to direct Anton Chekhov's The Cherry Orchard, with Annette Bening, Alfred Molina, Sarah Paulson and Lothaire Bluteau, which opened at the Mark Taper Forum in Los Angeles in February 2006.

Mathias has had a home in South Africa since 1997 after visiting the country with the National Theatre in 1994 for a series of workshops. He made his South African directing debut in July 2004 with Jean Anouilh's Antigone at the Rhodes Theatre at the Grahamstown National Arts Festival, starring the South African actor John Kani. "I had fallen out of love with London," he told the Financial Times in October 2004. "I felt I had exhausted my life in London. I couldn't invent myself any more. My life was frenetic and there was never time to absorb experiences. Then I had a series of deaths of people close to me, my mother died and a long-term relationship broke up. After that, right then, I felt I had failed." In 2007, he directed novelist Edna O'Brien's play, Triptych, in Johannesburg, starring leading South African actor Dorothy-Anne Gould.

He began 2008 by directing a revival of Ring Round the Moon, Christopher Fry's adaption of Jean Anouilh's comedy, L'Invitation au Château, starring Angela Thorne at the West End Playhouse Theatre (opening in February 2008). He followed this with the UK production of Triptych at the London Southwark Playhouse in April 2008.

He directed McKellen and Patrick Stewart in Samuel Beckett's Waiting for Godot, which toured the UK in early 2009 before opening at the Theatre Royal Haymarket, London in May 2009. It was his first production as 2009 artistic director of the Theatre Royal Haymarket.

His second play at the Theatre Royal Haymarket was a stage version of Truman Capote's Breakfast at Tiffany's, adapted for the stage by British playwright Samuel Adamson and starring Anna Friel, which opened in September 2009, with some critics commenting negatively on the adaptation though noting the actors' "good performances" and the play's "fluent staging".

Mathias directed Waiting For Godot and No Man's Land in repertory on Broadway at the Cort Theatre again starring Ian McKellen and Patrick Stewart. The plays ran from November 2013 to 30 March 2014 to rave reviews – with Ben Brantley of The New York Times calling them "Absurdly Enjoyable" and "...these productions find the pure entertainment value in existential emptiness."

In 2016 he directed No Man's Land at the Wyndham's Theatre with McKellen, Stewart, Owen Teale and Damien Molony, winning the Standard Award for Best Revival that year.

In 2017 Mathias directed Martin Sherman's play Gently Down The Stream at the Public Theatre in New York starring Harvey Fierstein. The play was subsequently produced at the Park Theatre in London in 2019. Following this he directed The Exorcist at the Birmingham Rep transferring to the Phoenix Theatre in the West End.

Also in 2019 Mathias directed his one-man show Ian McKellen On Stage touring the UK and playing a season at the Pinter Theatre raising more than five million pounds for theatre charities. He then directed his own play A Prayer For Wings at the Volcano Theatre as part of the Grand Theatre's celebration of Swansea's fiftieth anniversary as a city. The play transferred to the King's Head Theatre in London.

From 2020 to 2024 Mathias was artistic director at Theatre Royal Windsor for the summer seasons directing eight plays, many of which toured and Frank and Percy transferred to the West End before being made into a movie.

In 2025 Mathias directed a revised version of his play Swansea Boy at the Volcano Theatre in Swansea.

=== Film director ===
Mathias is also known as a film director with his first feature film, Bent, being released in 1997. It starred Clive Owen alongside McKellen, Mick Jagger, Rupert Graves, Jude Law and Lothaire Bluteau. It won the Prix de la Jeunesse at the Cannes film festival.

In 2016 Mathias's production of No Man's Land was filmed for NT Live.

In 2019 Mathias's production of Ian McKellen On Stage was filmed for NT Live.

In 2024 he directed a movie of Hamlet with Ian McKellen in the title role. The movie was shot entirely inside the Theatre Royal, Windsor during the Covid Pandemic and was cast disregarding age, race and gender.

In 2026 Mathias's film of Frank and Percy starring Ian McKellen, Roger Allam, Joanna Lumley, Jessica Gunning and Stephen Fry premiered at The London Film Festival.

He is the Executive Producer on the short film The One Note Man, 2023, which has won numerous awards internationally and was shortlisted for an Academy Award

Awards and Nominations

Mathias has been nominated for the Olivier Award and The Tony Award and twice won The Standard Award, WhatsOnStage Award, Cardiff International Film Festival Award, the Critics’ Circle Award, a Fringe First at Edinburgh and the Prix de la Jeunesse at Cannes as well as various other awards at International Film Festivals.

== Personal life ==
Mathias was in a relationship with actor Ian McKellen from 1978 to 1987. He married his partner Paul de Lange in South Africa in 2008.

== List of works ==
=== Directing ===
- Exceptions (1988)
- The Bed Before Yesterday 1989, International Tour
- Bent (1989), Adelphi Theatre, London
- Bent (1990), Lyttelton, National Theatre, London and Garrick Theatre, London
- Talking Heads (1990), Haymarket Theatre, London
- Noel and Gertie (1991), Duke of York's Theatre, London
- Uncle Vanya (1992), Cottesloe, National Theatre, London
- Ghosts (1993), Sherman Theatre, Cardiff
- Design for Living (1994), Donmar Warehouse, London and Gielgud Theatre, London
- Les Parents terribles (1994), Lyttelton, National Theatre, London
- A Little Night Music (1995), Olivier, National Theatre, London
- Indiscretions (formerly Les Parents terribles) (1996), Ethel Barrymore Theatre, New York City
- Marlene (1997), London
- Antony and Cleopatra (1998), Olivier, National Theatre, London
- Suddenly Last Summer (1999), Comedy Theatre, London
- Marlene (1999), Cort Theatre, Broadway
- Dance of Death (2001), Broadhurst Theatre, Broadway
- Servicemen (2001), Theater at St Clement's, Off-Broadway
- The Elephant Man (2002), Royale Theatre, Broadway
- Company (2002), Kennedy Center Eisenhower Theater, Washington, D.C.
- Dance of Death (2003), Lyric Theatre, London and Theatre Royal, Sydney
- Antigone (2004), Baxter Theatre Centre, Cape Town
- Aladdin (2004), Old Vic, London
- Shoreditch Madonna (2005), Soho Theatre, London
- Aladdin (2005), Old Vic, London
- The Cherry Orchard (2006), Mark Taper Forum, Los Angeles
- Triptych (2007), Market Theatre, Johannesburg
- Ring Round the Moon (L'Invitation au Château) (2008), Playhouse Theatre, London
- Triptych (2008), Southwark Playhouse, London
- Waiting for Godot (2009), Theatre Royal Haymarket, London
- Breakfast at Tiffany's (2009), Theatre Royal Haymarket, London
- The Syndicate (2011), Chichester Festival Theatre and Theatre Royal, Bath
- No Man's Land and Waiting for Godot (2013), Cort Theatre, Broadway (in repertory)
- The Unbuilt City, New York Stage and Film 2015
- No Man's Land (2016), UK Tour and Wyndham's Theatre, London
- The Exorcist (2016), Birmingham Repertory Theatre, Phoenix Theatre, London and UK tour
- Gently Down the Stream, Public Theatre, 2017
- Savage Love, Public Theatre NY, 2018
- Gently Down the Stream, Park Theatre, London 2019
- Ian McKellen on Stage (2019), UK and Ireland tour, Harold Pinter Theatre, London and Hudson Theatre, Broadway
- A Prayer For Wings (2019), King's Head Theatre, London
- Hamlet, Theatre Royal Windsor 2021
- The Cherry Orchard, Theatre Royal Windsor, 2021
- Dial M For Murder, Theatre Royal Windsor, 2022
- The Chalk Garden, Theatre Royal Windsor, UK Tour, 2022
- Frank and Percy, Theatre Royal Windsor, UK Tour, The Other Palace West End, 2023
- Alone Together, Theatre Royal Windsor, 2023
- Accolade, Theatre Royal Windsor, UK Tour, 2024
- Filumena, Theatre Royal Windsor, UK Tour, 2024
- Swansea Boy, Volcano Theatre Swansea, 2025

=== Writing ===
Source: Dollee

- Cowardice (1983), Ambassadors Theatre, London
- Infidelities (1985), Edinburgh Festival Fringe and Donmar Warehouse, London
- A Prayer For Wings (1987), Edinburgh Festival Fringe and Bush Theatre, London
- Poor Nanny (1989), King's Head Theatre, London
- Swansea Boys (1990). National Theatre Studio, London
- A Prayer For Wings (2019), Volcano Theatre, Swansea and King's Head Theatre, London
- Swansea Boy (2025) Volcano Theatre, Swansea

=== Acting ===
- Hair, 1973, UK Tour
- How Green Was my Valley (1976)
- Angels, (1976)
- Survivors (1977) – Mike
- A Bridge Too Far (1977) – Irish Guards lieutenant
- Kilvert's Diaries (1978)
- Priest of Love (1981) – Secretary
- Minder (1982) – Dafydd
- The Scarlet Pimpernel (1982) – Dispatcher
- One Summer (1983) – Owen
- White Mischief (1987) – Gerald Portman
- Long Day's Journey Into Night, 1984, Arts Theatre, Westminster Theatre
- Elegies for Angels Punks and Raging Queens, 1993, Criterion Theatre,

=== Script-Writer ===
- The Lost Language of Cranes (1991), BBC TV

=== Books ===
- Manhattan Mourning, Brilliance Books, 1988, ISBN 978-0946189373
