= Private Affair =

Private Affair, Private Affairs or variants thereof may refer to:

== Films ==
- Private Affairs (1925 film), an American silent drama film
- Private Affairs (1940 film), an American comedy starring Nancy Kelly
- Private Affairs (1987 film) (Ti presento un'amica), an Italian comedy drama directed by Francesco Massaro
- A Private Affair (1993 film) (Italian: Una questione privata), an Italian film with Rupert Graves
- A Private Affair (2002 film) (French: Une affaire privée), a French thriller with Marion Cotillard

== Television ==
- "A Private Affair", a 1956 episode of Captain Gallant of the Foreign Legion
- "Private Affair", a 1991 episode of Major Dad
- "Private Affair", a 2002 episode of All Saints
- A Private Affair (TV series) (Spanish: Un Asunto Privado), a 2022 Spanish detective drama, set in the 1940s

== Music ==
- "Private Affair", from the 1978 album Eternally Yours by The Saints
- "Private Affair", from the 1990 album Eyes Don't Lie by Donny Osmond
- "A Private Affair", from the 1998 album Alchemy by Leah Andreone
- "Private Affair", from the 1999 album Peculiar Situation by Earl Klugh
- "Private Affair", from the 2008 album The Virgins by The Virgins
- Private Affair (album), a 2010 Tagalog and English album by Kyla

== Novels ==
- A Private Matter (novel), a 1963 Italian wartime novel by Beppe Fenoglio

== See also ==
- Her Private Affair, a 1929 film
- A Private's Affair, a 1959 film
- A Very Private Affair (French: Vie privée), a 1962 French film
- "A Very Private Affair", an episode of the 1963-64 TV series The Lieutenant
