= 1560 Assembly of Notables =

Political assembly of French grandees

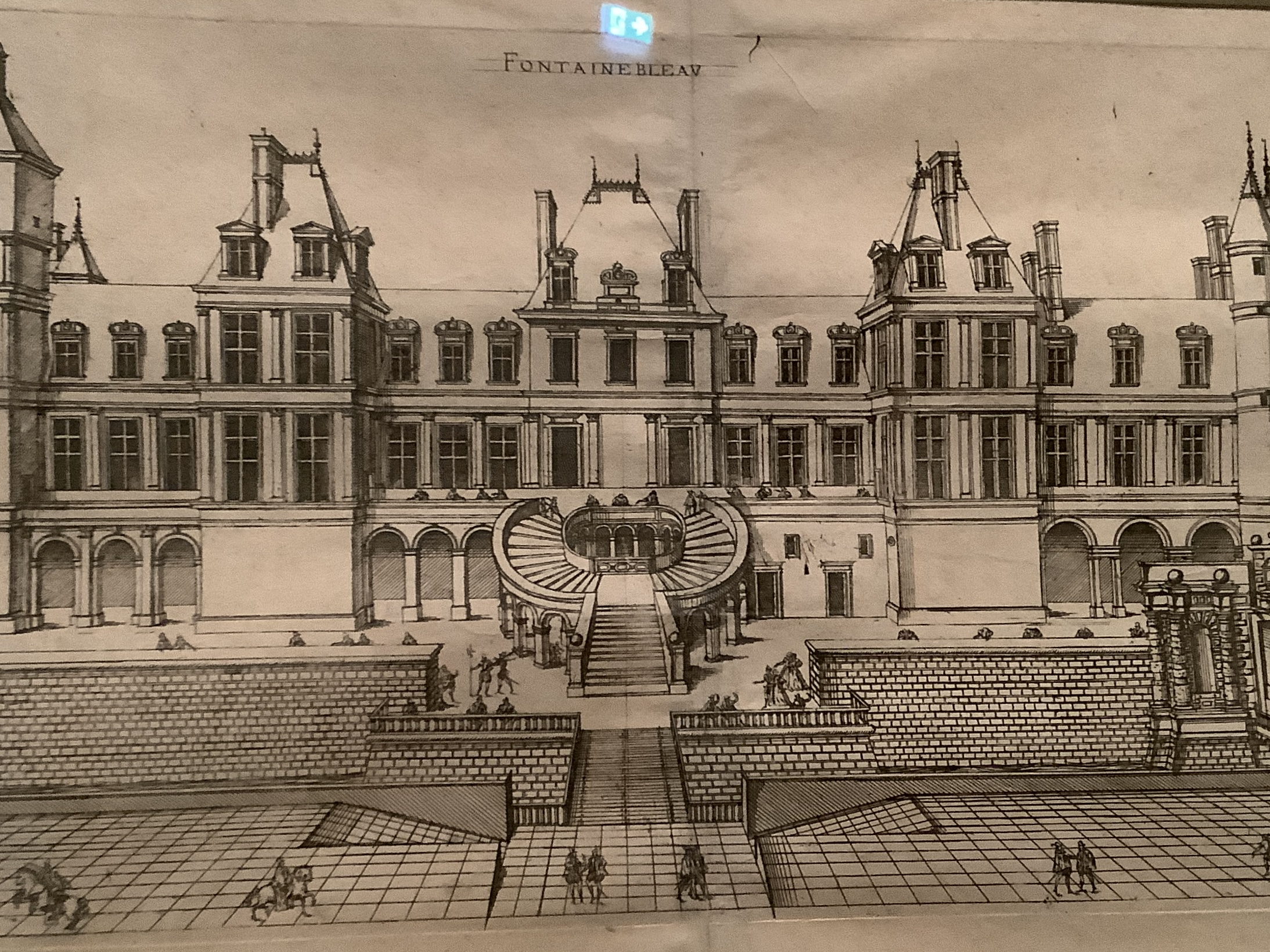
Château de Fontainebleau, at which the Assembly would be held, during the sixteenth-century

The 1560 Assembly of Notables (French: Assemblée des notables de 1560) was a gathering of the political elite of the kingdom of France from 21 to 26 August 1560 that aimed to find a solution to France's political, religious and financial crisis. From the start of François II's reign in 1559 the kingdom had been in a difficult position, burdened with a great debt. This was made more complicated in March 1560 by a politico-religious crisis when a Protestant coup attempted to seize the king and remove him from his chief ministers, the duc de Guise (duke of Guise) and cardinal de Lorraine. Though this failed, the realm was greatly destabilised, and disorders would continue throughout the remainder of 1560. Around the same time as the conspiracy, a combination of the cardinal de Lorraine, the queen mother Catherine and the amiral de Coligny (admiral of Coligny) resolved to abandon persecution of Protestantism and embark on a new path. This was embodied in the May Edict of Romorantin. Some combination of these figures then resolved that it would be necessary to summon together an enlarged version of the king's council to devise a solution to the kingdoms troubles, and achieve a number of other objectives.

Thus on 21 August, 54 notables met at the royal residence of Fontainebleau. Proceedings were opened by the chancellor L'Hôpital before Guise and Lorraine explained the state of the various areas of royal administration they were responsible for. At the start of the second session on 23 August, the amiral de Coligny interjected himself at the start of proceedings and presented to the king two petitions from the Protestants of Normandie that were then read to the assembled notables. After this interruption the bishop of Valence spoke, he denounced persecution and the Papacy and spoke in favour of concord with Protestantism. He also advocated for a meeting of the Estates General. The next speech was that of the archbishop of Vienne. Vienne expounded on the view that the reunification of the Christian church would best be brought about peaceably. He then strongly advocated for a church council and a meeting of the Estates General. On 24 August, Coligny spoke more formally. He endorsed the petitions he had presented the prior day that sought temples (churches) for Protestant worship, putting him in a more radical position than that of Valence and Vienne. He then denounced the religious policy of the Lorraine-Guise government and the security under which they kept the king. When it was Guise's turn to speak he defended the necessity of François' security and challenged Coligny's petitions. The argument between the two became heated. After Guise spoke Lorraine. He endorsed the need for an Estates General and reform of the church (that might require a church council). He expressed the belief that peaceable Protestants could be left in peace by the state, which should only trouble itself with those who tried to worship under arms or who caused other disorders. Lorraine's position was endorsed by a majority of the present notables on 26 August. On 31 August the king announced the summoning of the Estates General to meet at Meaux on 10 December, and a church council to meet on 20 January 1561. The assembly failed to reunify the elite of the kingdom, with the absentee prince de Condé and king of Navarre engaging in rebellious acts during August and September. It also failed to make clear the crowns religious policy.

== Background ==
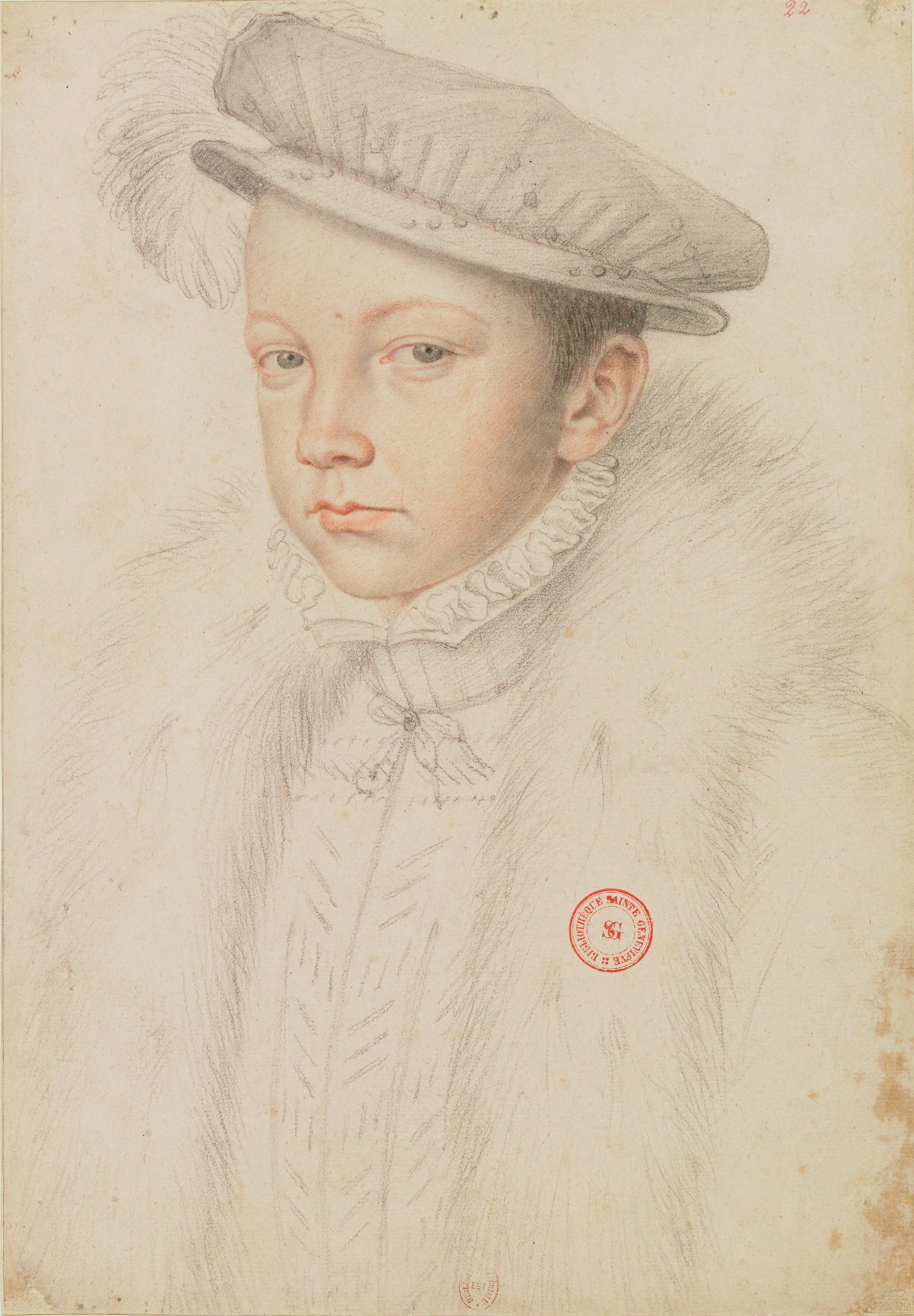
François II, whose reign would be plagued by political and religious crisis

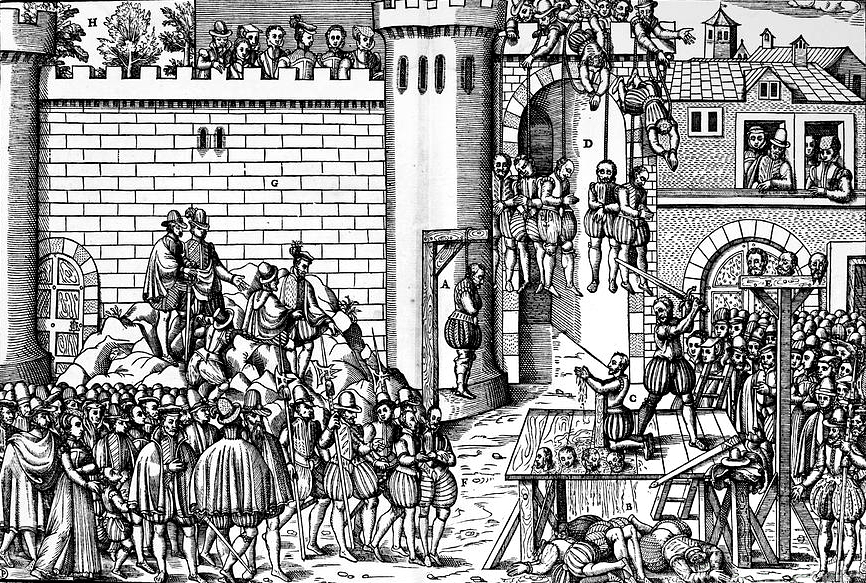
Bloody suppression of the Conjuration d'Amboise

=== Conjuration d'Amboise ===
At the start of the reign of François II in 1559, the French royal debt totalled around 43,000,000 livres. In March 1560 there was a failed coup attempt at the royal residence of Amboise. an event known as the conjuration d'Amboise. Protestant rebels made an attempt to kidnap the young king François and thereby remove him from the influence of his wife's Catholic uncles the duc de Guise (duke of Guise) and cardinal de Lorraine (cardinal of Lorraine). There were great reverberations from the episode. The repression that crushed the conjuration after the attempted attack on the gates on 17 March was a violent one. Conspirators were hanged, drowned and beheaded. Some Protesatant contemporaries, such as the sieur de Soubise were moved by events. In the wake of the conjuration, the cardinal de Lorraine was subject to virulent abuse in the pamphlet 'Le Tigre' (The Tiger) by the Protestant Hotman which denounced him as a 'viper' who 'abused the youth of our king'. Many other pamphlets also heaped scorn on Lorraine and the duc de Guise.

In reaction to the violence of the suppression of the conjuration d'Amboise, the queen mother Catherine began to distance herself from the Lorraine led government. Despite this, neither she nor the king were entirely convinced by the protestations of the conspirators that their efforts had been targeted at the Lorraine led government and not François himself.

She entrusted the amiral de Coligny (admiral of Coligny) with a mission into Normandie to undertake an investigation. It was thus to this end that Coligny devoted himself after his departure from Amboise. In addition to this, while in Normandie in April Coligny would work towards the undertaking of a military expedition to Scotland.

=== Moderate policy ===
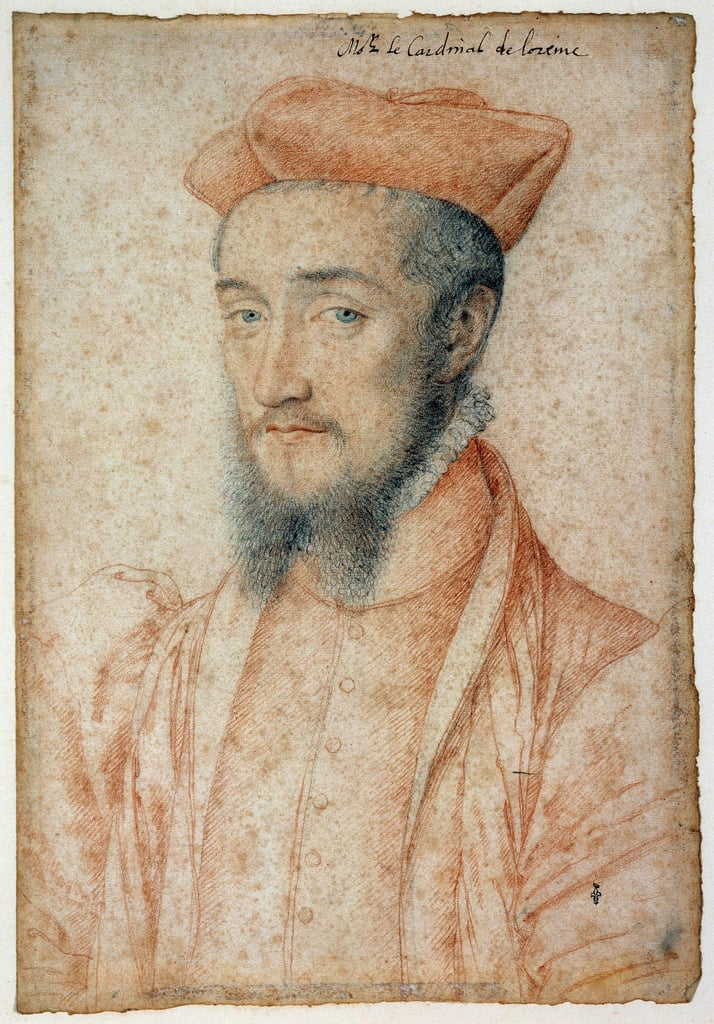
Cardinal de Lorraine, leader of the French government and one of the architects of the moderation of the persecution of Protestants during 1560

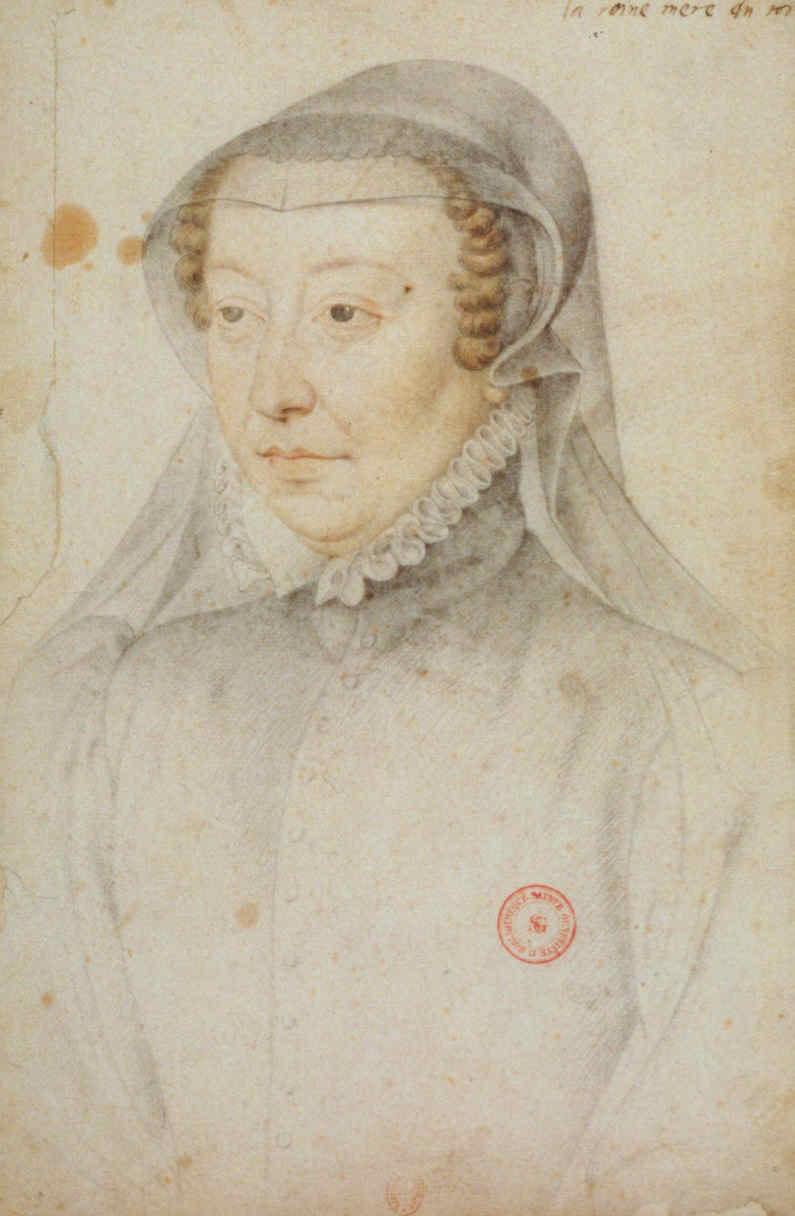
Catherine, mother of François II, one of the architects of the moderation of persecution of Protestants during 1560

The cardinal de Lorraine and the duc de Guise were disconcerted by the hostility they had faced in the conjuration. The cardinal de Lorraine was of the opinion that it was no longer practical to imagine 'extirpating heresy' (i.e. Protestantism). According to Le Roux, Lorraine took on a policy of conciliation, instituting the Edict of Romorantin in May 1560 while effectively abolished the death penalty for Protestantism, and differentiated the crime of 'heresy' from that of sedition, while maintaining the illegality of Protestant worship. According to Pernot it was Catherine who took the initiative on this edict, and Lorraine followed her course. Those Protestants who had been arrested solely on the grounds of their religion were to be freed.

Lorraine and Guise assented to the replacement of the recently deceased chancellor Olivier by the distinguished lawyer L'Hôpital in June. L'Hôpital was an Erasmian humanist, who desired to reinforce the authority of the monarchy and preserve peace. He looked to further the policy of religious moderation embodied by the crown in the last few months. Nevertheless, he did not believe two religions could co-exist in France. He was the choice of Catherine, and intended to favour no one party at the court. Nevertheless, he would not openly oppose the Lorraine led government.

=== Continued disorders ===
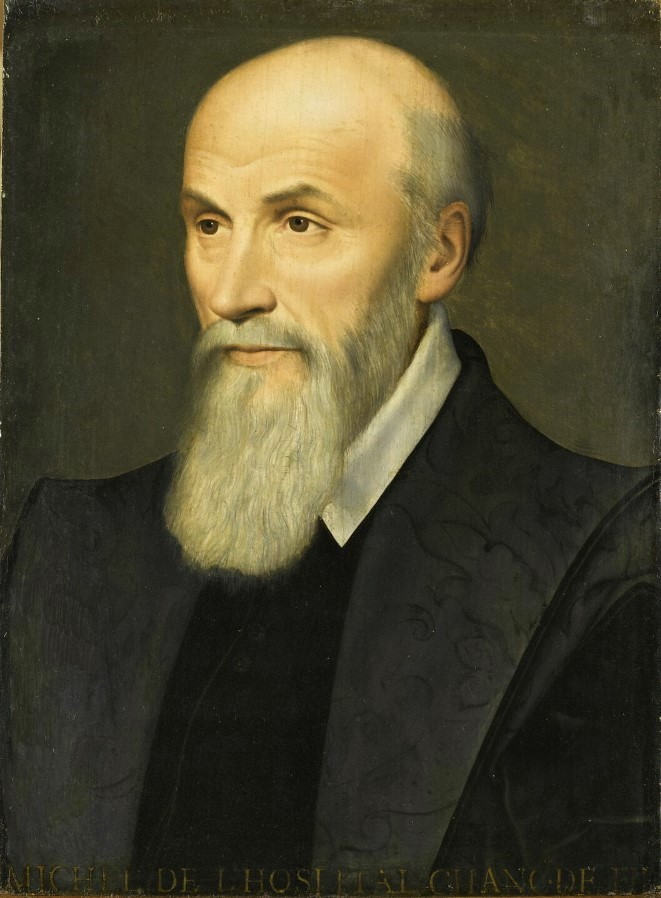
L'Hôpital, chancellor of France from June 1560 and a driver of a policy of religious concord

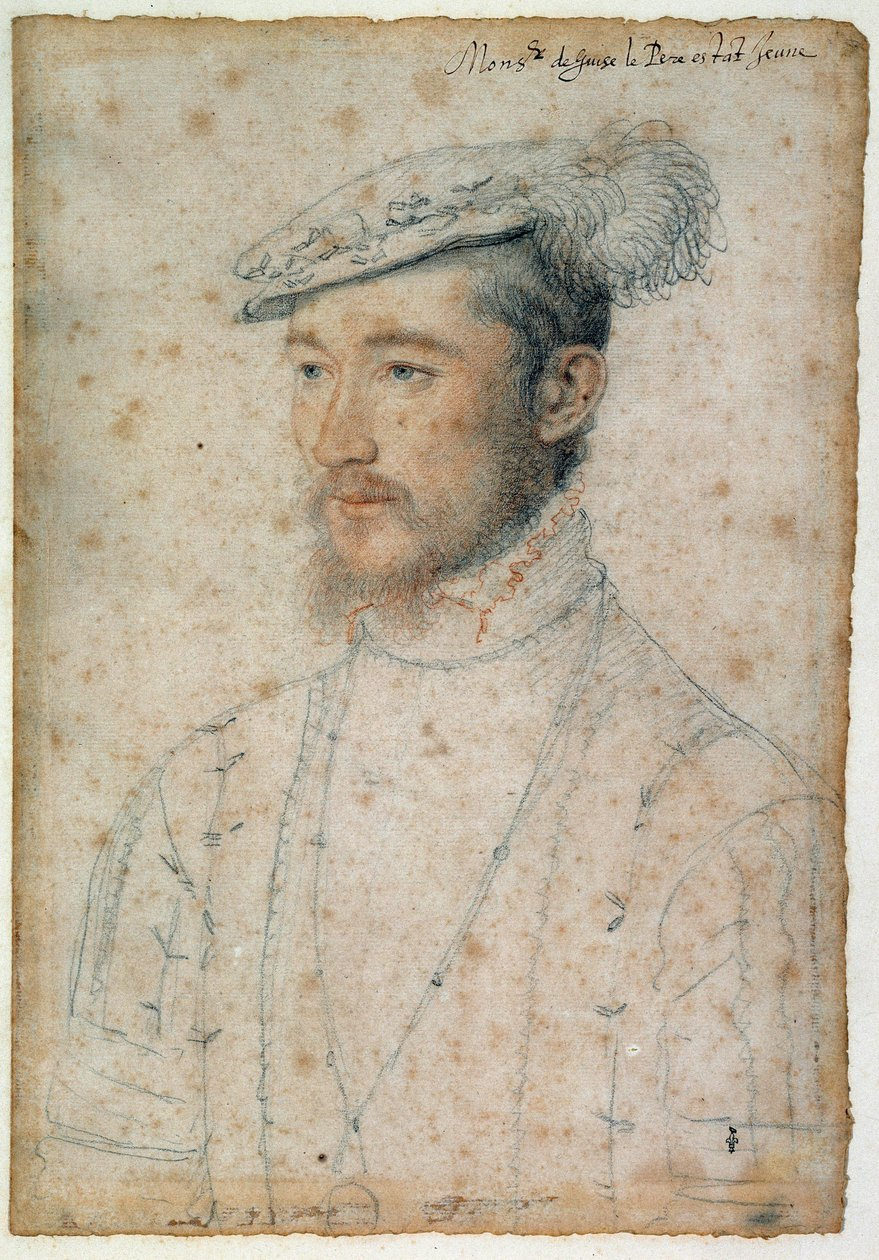
Duc de Guise, lieutenant-général du royaume during 1560

The aftershocks of Amboise were reverberating through the kingdom at this time in continued disorders. Churches were attacked in Guyenne, Languedoc and Provence. Armed men had risen up in Dauphiné, Provence and Guyenne and begun seizing towns. Shortly before the Assembly of Notables would meet, on 19 August, Jean Sturm informed the Danish king that "the Gallic conspiracy, suppressed in the first outbreak, seems to be secretly increased and strengthened, and what before was advanced by secret plots now seems ready to erupt into open war." The disorders culminated in a failed Protestant attempt to seize Lyon on 4 September shortly after the Assembly, led by a captain who had been involved in the conjuration d'Amboise. Concurrent to these rebellions, peasants also entered rebellion against the dîmes (tithes) they had to pay to the Catholic church. Such refusals would occur in both the north and south of the kingdom.

== Calling an Assembly ==
Catherine adopted the moderate political attitude of the cardinal de Lorraine. To this end she summoned an Assembly to meet at Fontainebleau in August. The cardinal de Lorraine and L'Hôpital also campaigned for the summoning of such an Assembly. According to Constant, Cloulas and Mariéjol, it was Coligny who advocated for the summoning of the Assembly, and the duc de Guise supported him in this. Carroll argues the initiative came from Guise and Lorraine who intended to outmanoeuvre the Bourbon princes. Sutherland argues Guise and Lorraine were not opposed to the Assembly, in the hopes that they might dominate it. It was hoped that through this meeting a consensus, among the elites of the kingdom at least, could be re-established after the discord of the previous months. L'Hôpital hoped that the great nobles, including the Bourbon princes might be sated through the opportunity to participate in the government of the kingdom. The Assembly would have the effect of gaining the appropriate buy-in for the new quasi-tolerant policy of religious concord the crown was pursuing prior to any church council. Another advantage of the Assembly would be that it would disprove the assertion levelled by opponents of the present regime that François was a child in the clutches of his wife's uncles (Lorraine and Guise). It would also possibly pave the way for Catherine's desired Estates General. In addition to the religious and political crisis, the kingdom also continued to face a financial crisis.

Great efforts were made to see the Bourbon princes show up for the Assembly.

Shortly before the meeting of the Assembly. François inducted a new batch of seventeen chevaliers (knights) of the Ordre de Saint-Michel (Order of Saint-Michel) so that the crowns preferred policies during the meeting would enjoy a comfortable majority. The recipients were chosen by the duc de Guise from among his comrades. This method also offered the benefit of rewarding those who had shown loyalty to the crown during this unstable year. Such a move would be replicated before the showdown with Condé in October of the same year.

=== Attendees ===
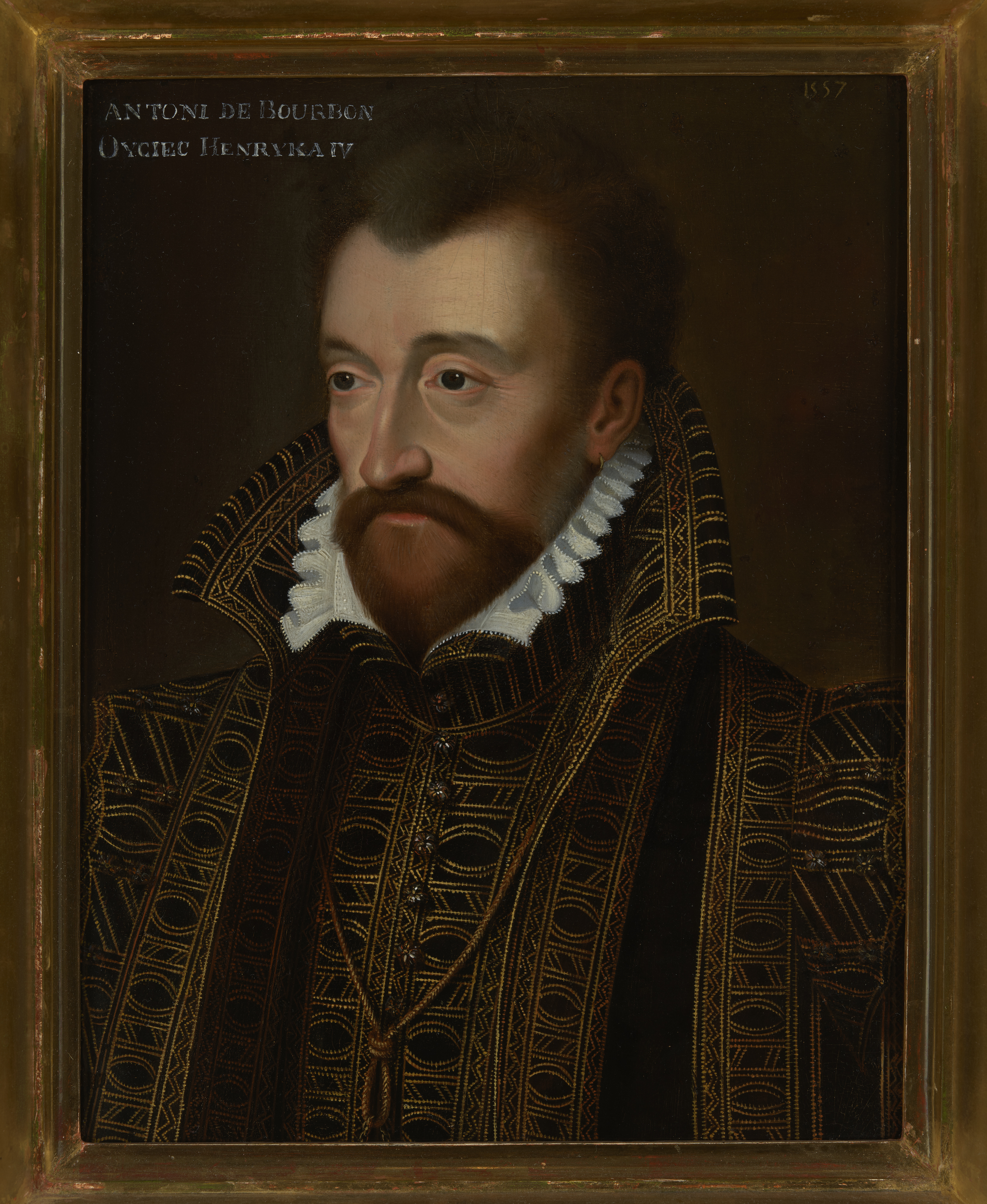
King of Navarre, the premier prince du sang, high-profile absentee, he would be involved in rebellion against the crown during this period

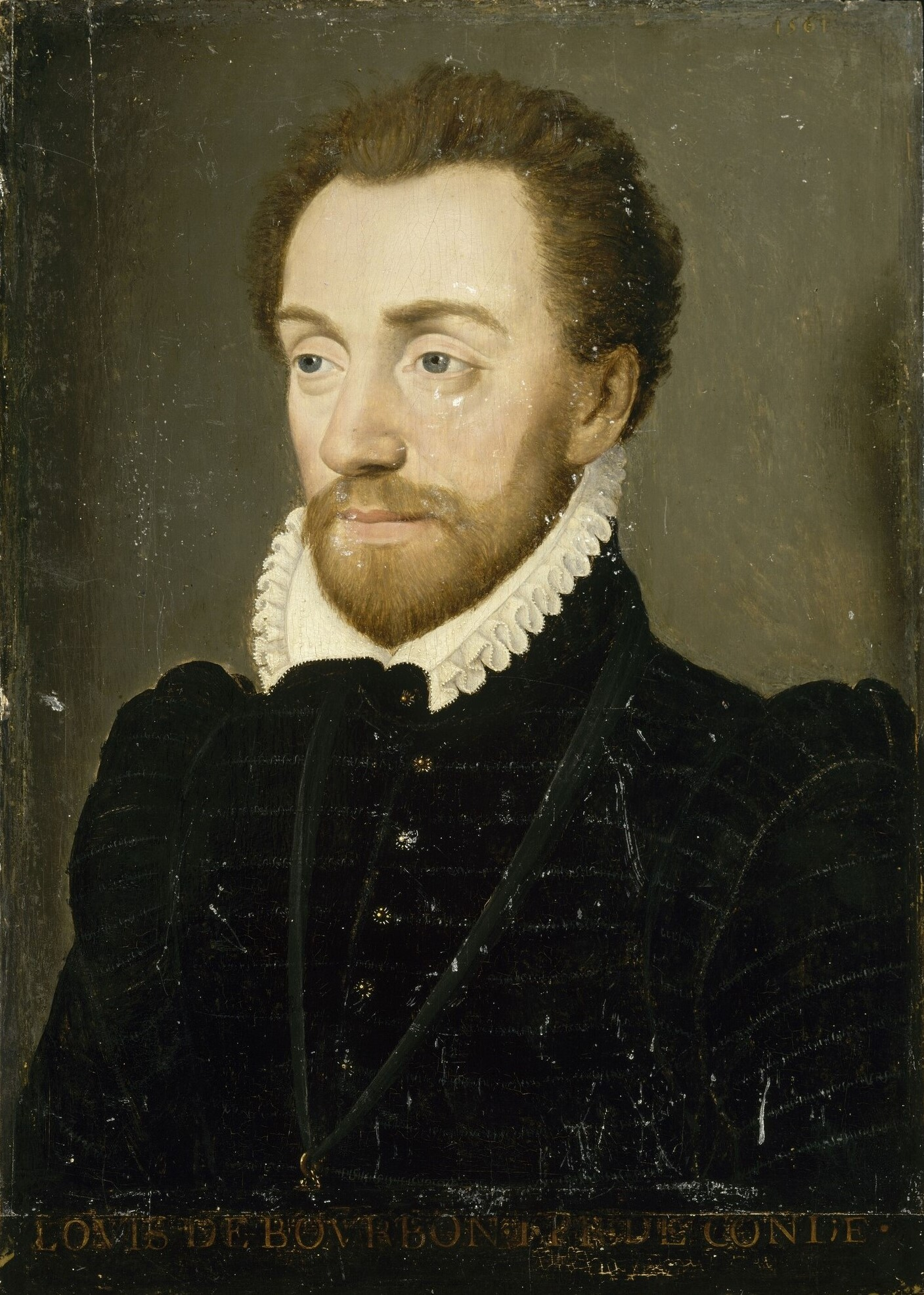
Prince de Condé, a prince du sang and a high-profile absentee, he would be involved in rebellion against the crown during this period

In total the meeting would involve 54 persons. Members of the royal conseil privé (privy council), the princes du sang (princes of the blood - agnatic descendants of the royal line outside the royal family), the trésoriers de l'épargne (receivers of royal revenues), the maîtres des rêquetes (senior judicial figures), the sécretaires d'État (secretaries of state) and the chevaliers de l'Ordre de Saint-Michel were invited. Unlike the estates general the large majority of the participants were not elected, and thus the body had the character of an enlarged and more serious version of the king's conseil.

Chief among the attendees were members of the royal family as represented by the king François, the queen Mary, his mother Catherine, and François' two eldest brothers the duc d'Orléans and the duc d'Angoulême.

For the royal administration, present were the chancellor L'Hôpital, the surintendant des finances (superintendent of the finances) Avançon, the grand écuyer the marquis de Boisy, the maître des requêtes ordinaire de l'hôtel du roi (a senior legal official) du Mortier, and the four sécretaires d'État (L'Aubespine, Bourdin, de Fresnes and Alluye . The queen mother's chevalier d'honneur (knight of honour) the comte de Crussol was at the Assembly, as was an unknown other chevalier de l'ordre de Saint-Michel that Romier speculates might have been the baron de Fourquevaux as he was at the French court at this time.

The sécretaires d'État occupied a subordinate position during the meeting of the Assembly of Notables. They were to take notes and perhaps transmit orders.

The connétable de Montmorency (constable of Montmorency) who was at this time involved in a ruinous lawsuit with the duc de Guise over control of the comté de Dammartin (county of Dammartin) made a grand show of force in his attendance, arriving with an escort of eight hundred horsemen. Even for a grandee of Montmorency's stature this represented a large retinue. Among those who arrived with him were two of his sons (the maréchal de Montmorency and the seigneur de Damville), and his Châtillon nephews: the amiral de Coligny, the colonel-général de l'infantrie (colonel-general of the infantry) Andelot and the cardinal de Châtillon. By this means he hoped to demonstrate that his years of power were not over.

For the Lorraine-Guise family the large majority of the male members were represented at the Assembly. The cardinal de Lorraine and cardinal de Guise, the duc de Guise (and his son the prince de Joinville), duc d'Aumale and the marquis d'Elbeuf. Only the grand prieur (grand prior) was absent at sea. For the woman, the duchesse de Guise (duchess of Guise) and duchesse douairière de Guise (dowager duchess of Guise) were present.

The Lorraine family proper was also represented, by the duc de Lorraine and his wife the duchesse de Lorraine, who was the daughter of the queen mother Catherine.

For the princes du sang the cardinal de Bourbon of the Bourbon-Vendôme branch and duc de Montpensier and prince de La Roche-sur-Yon of the Bourbon-Montpensier branch were in attendance. Montpensier's wife the duchesse de Montpensier and his eldest son the prince dauphin d'Auvergne were with the prince. While La Roche-sur-Yon's wife was not present his son the marquis de Beaupré was.

Notably absent would be the other princes du sang of the Bourbon-Vendôme branch: the prince de Condé and the king of Navarre. Fearing that the summons was a trap they remained at Navarre's court in Nérac. This was despite the urgings of the connétable de Montmorency who had implored them to join with him at the Assembly. Their absence did much to negate their assertion that they were being unfairly excluded from the government of the realm. Some believed that had they come quickly, and in force, they might have wrested control of the government from the Lorraine-Guise. From their southern stronghold, Condé and Navarre drew up a remonstrance in which they characterised Guise and Lorraine as tyrants.

For the maréchaux (marshals) de France, all four were present. The seigneur de Saint-André, the comte de Brissac, the baron de Châteaubriant and seigneur de Termes. There were also several grandees who would go on to become maréchaux in the coming years: the seigneur de Gonnor, seigneur de Vielleville and seigneur de Sansac.

Also among those present were the royal conseillers the bishop of Valence (a man very close to Catherine), the bishop of Orléans and the archbishop of Vienne (a client of the Lorraine princes). It was by virtue of their position on the conseil that they spoke at the Assembly. All three were liberal in disposition and suspected by the ultra Catholics of being Protestant. The duc de Nevers (with his two sons that would both succeed him to the duché François and Jacques), marquis de Villars (a brother in law of the connétable Montmorency) duc de Longueville and comte de Gruyère also made an appearance for the occasion. The Italian nobles Ludovico who would in future become the duc de Nevers by marriage, and the duca di Bracciano were with the others at Fontainebleau. Durot notes the presence of the German noble the Kurfürst von der Pfalz (elector of the Pfalz).

The Assembly would meet from 21 to 26 August.

== 21 August ==
=== Opening address ===
The first session opened on 21 August at 13:00 in the queen mothers chambers under the presidency of the king. Catherine made a request that her son be given advice on how to approach the situation in which he found himself in. She asked that those present inform François how best to maintain the sceptre in his hand, and see to it that those who were discontented might be soothed. Proceedings were then opened by the chancellor L'Hôpital who delivered a speech explaining the purpose of the gathering, he analogised the situation to that of a doctor and his patient. The kingdom was the ill patient, and those assembled must identify the cause of its malady so that they might best administer the cure. He argued those gathered had the necessary authority to heal the kingdom without the need for the summoning of the Estates General. He was followed by the duc de Guise and cardinal de Lorraine who gave an account of their stewardship of the state in matters of defence and finance respectively. Guise discussed matters in his capacity as lieutenant-général du royaume (lieutenant-general of the kingdom), laying out papers that demonstrated the state of the French army. Lorraine meanwhile explained to the assembled nobles the size of the royal deficit, which had now reached 2,500,000 livres annually.

== 23 August ==
=== Unexpected petitions ===
During the second session on 23 August, Coligny seized the opportunity to speak before François had even had chance to offer the floor to the bishop of Orléans. For the first time he adopted a public position in favour of Protestantism. Rising from his seat he went over to the king. Bowing twice before François he explained that he had recently travelled to Normandie in the service of François and the queen mother. This was to the end both of understanding the religious troubles in the province and of preparing for the war in Scotland. It was likely due to the fact his mission to Normandie was a royal one that he was allowed to go ahead with his presentation. He presented two petitions on behalf of the 'poor Christians' of Normandie who wished for an end to the persecution they experienced. These petitions were handed to the sécretaire d'État L'Aubespine who was instructed by the king to read them to those assembled, this was unusual and surprised many. The king reportedly received them with kindness. The historian Romier explains that the petitions were allowed to be presented so that the speeches that were planned to follow that attacked the Papacy and argued in favour of a more limited toleration from the cardinal de Lorraine and the other churchmen present would appear less scandalous by comparison to foreign observers.

In the first petition the Protestants of Normandie protested against the libellous depictions of them as 'troublemakers'. The petitioners argued they abided by the old and new testaments, and the apostolic creed. The Protestants of Normandie compared their treatment to that afforded the Jews. They argued that in some places in Christendom, for the sake of good order and harmony the Jews had been permitted temples in which to conduct their worship, despite how 'abominable' this was in the eyes of god. From this they argued, how much more worthy of temples were those who recognised Jesus as their saviour. They asked for freedom of worship and temples (the term they used for churches) with buildings allocated to them according to their population in the cities across France. In the second petition which was addressed to Catherine, it was plead that she have pity on the 'people of god' and free the church from its errors and abuses.

Having had his petitions read, Coligny assured the king of his loyalty, for which François opined that he was well pleased in Coligny's service and that the amiral had a good reputation.

On 23 August, The bishop of Valence, archbishop of Vienne and bishop of Orléans spoke before the Assembly. They stressed that the growth of Protestantism was the responsibility of the failings of the Catholic church. The abuses that dominated its organisation made it impossible for it to be a proper shepherd to the people.

=== Speech of the bishop of Valence ===
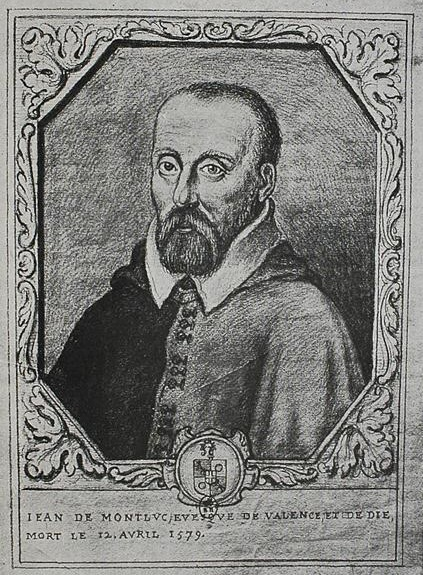
Bishop of Valence, a moderate Catholic conseiller

The bishop of Valence praised the actions of the Lorraine princes and the queen mother Catherine. He noted that the latter had used gentleness as opposed to force to bring about the suppression of the recent plots against the crown. He then moved on to an offensive footing. He attacked first the popes who he charged with fostering war between Christian princes for their amusement. He then moved on his attack to the 'lazy' bishops who hoarded their incomes and spent them in a scandalous fashion. He further charged that they recruited their priests from among their 'greedy and ignorant' servants. Such men could only lead their flocks astray. This was, according to the bishop, in stark contrast with the clergy of the Protestant faith, who conducted themselves with modesty and deplored all vices. It was no surprise therefore that they attained a large number of converts. He differentiated two types of Protestants, the first who were disreputable 'impious libertines' were those who took on the new faith as a means of escaping the practices of the church, and were always quick to resort to arms. The second group were those who earnestly believed Protestantism offered the path to salvation, and who would lay down their life and property to this end. The martyring of such Protestants was an upsetting matter to the bishop of Valence, he argued instead they should seek accord with such Christians. Exile should be the most serious offence that could be issued against a peaceful religious offender. Freedom of conscience could be separated from seditious assemblies. The national council of the church could even feature Protestant participation. While both the bishop of Valence and the archbishop of Vienne would adopt Gallican tones in their speeches, that of Valence would go further in his direct attacks on the Papacy. If it proved too difficult to convene a general council of the church, the bishop of Valence indicated his support for a national council.

=== Speech of the archbishop of Vienne ===
The archbishop of Vienne spoke next. Romier charges that the sophisticated nature of his harangue reflected the governments intention that it was the official position of the government intended for international consumption. The archbishop offered a justification for the royal policy of conciliation towards the Protestants that had been in effect since March. By this means France's relations with its neighbours could be better ensured. This was a matter in which Vienne was well versed, as he had experience in serving as a diplomat for the kingdom. This confirmed for the more conservative prelates their suspicion of his religious unorthodoxy. The reconciliation of Christians would occur through reform of the church as opposed to violence. To this end, he insisted also on the importance of convening a church council. In his estimation the Pope was too hostile to such a project, and the German princes, the Emperor and the foreign kings would have their own opinions on, timetables and desires for such a meeting which was unsuitable in the present moment when the need for a solution was a pressing one. Thus it would have to be a national one. On other church matters he deplored the strong presence of Italians in the church hierarchy accusing them of taking an 'infinity of pensions' and 'sucking our blood like leeches', appealed for residency in benefices, the elimination of simony and the preaching of the 'pure word of god'. He spoke the most eloquently on the need for an Estates General to meet. He described the body as an ancient form upon which the state of France was founded. He concluded his speech on the matter by arguing for the political maturity of the French people. With so many people assembled, the majority would tend towards service of the common good. For Vienne, the voice of the people often reflected the approval of god. He also emphasised the particularly important role that François and Catherine would play. Constant sees his speech as a transfer of his allegiance away from his former patrons, the Lorraine brothers. Though he did not directly impugn their government in his speech, they felt targeted. In Vienne's opinion there was a dual fault to be held for the troubles of earlier in the year: the conspirators at Amboise had been at fault, but so too had been the Catholic preachers who tried to drive the people to exterminate Protestantism. On the Lorraine government he stated that the Estates General would afford them the ability to confront the slanders against them and cleanse themselves of the poor regard in which they were being held. They could explain to the delegates the kingdom they had inherited, and the nature of their government. He further stated that the king had at his disposal the princes du sang the church and the nobility all of whom wished to protect his authority to the last drop of their blood. By this means according to Mariéjol he obliquely attacked the Lorraine princes by highlighting that they were not indispensable.

The bishop of Valence and archbishop of Vienne had both proposed both a national religious council that could rectify the kingdoms religious problems through a reform of the Catholic church and a meeting of the Estates General to remedy the financial and political problems of the kingdom. Jouanna argues that on the subject of a church council, the men were acting as mouth pieces for the new chancellor L'Hôpital and Catherine. Guise and Lorraine rallied to these proposals. For Jouanna their assent to these proposals was an unwilling need to go with the majority of the Assembly. There was also a degree to which they held out hope that the Estates offered the prospect of strengthening their hand, which had been so shaken by the conjuration.

Following the speeches of these two prelates, came short interventions from the maître des requêtes du Mortier, the bishop of Orléans and the surintendant des finances Avançon.

== 24 August ==
=== Speech of Admiral Coligny ===
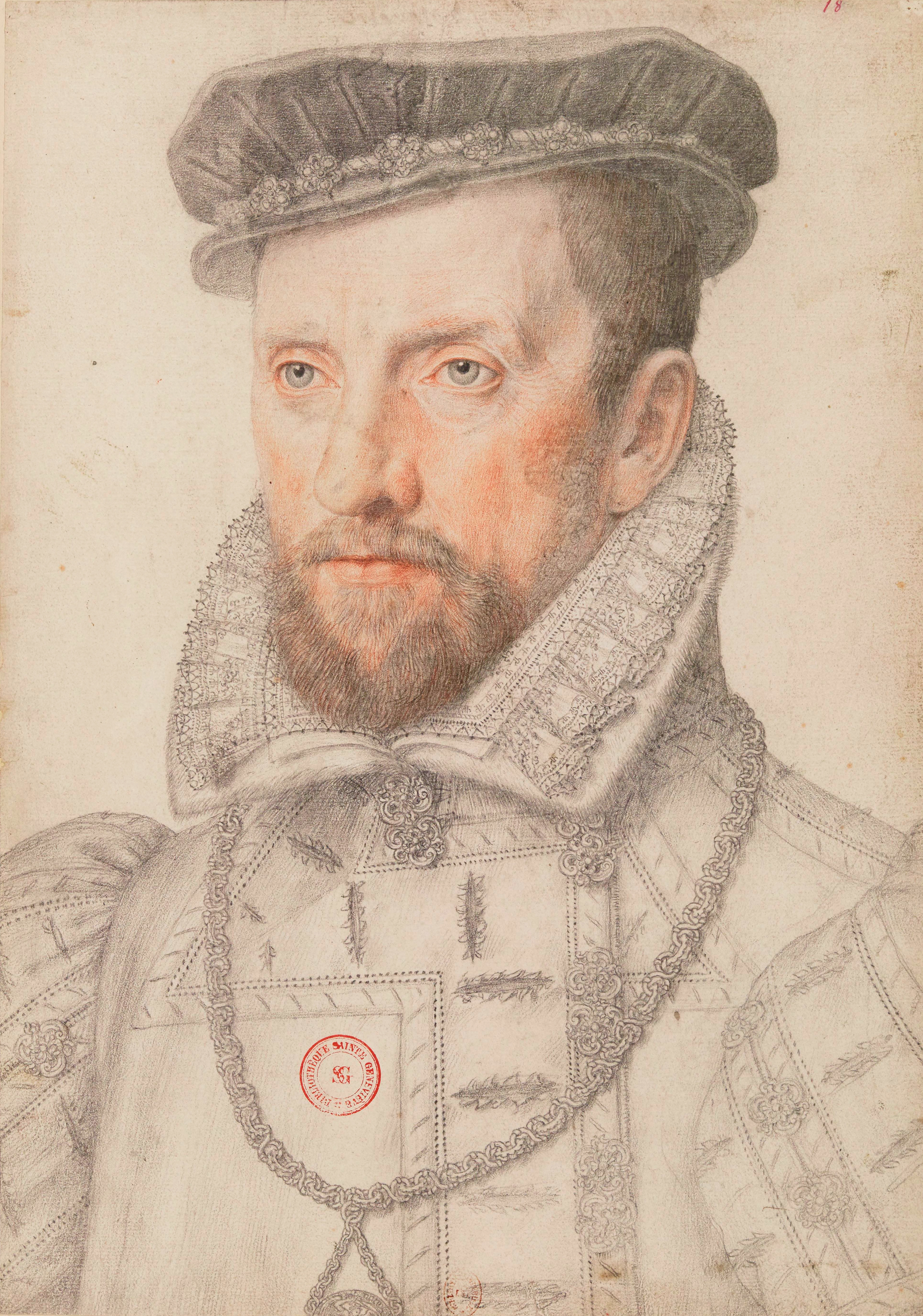
Admiral de Coligny, who presented the Protestant petitions towards the beginning of the Assembly of Notables

When proceedings began the next day at the same time, it would be Coligny who was first to speak. Coligny endorsed the petitioners request he had provided previously that the Protestants be granted temples. He argued to Catherine that it would be an excellent solution to the unrest that had accompanied Protestant worship in the past if it was held in buildings instead. For Coligny there was no other solution than to legalise Protestantism on at least a temporary basis for the ensuring of peace in the realm. This would be until such time as a national council of the church could be summoned. Criticism between Coligny and the government became open (without him specifically naming his target) when he challenged the fact that the king was surrounded by a guard of arquebusiers under the command of the sieur de Richelieu (which had been provided by the duc de Guise). He also noted with disapproval the cancellation of the royal tour of the kingdom. The amiral opined that one was left to conclude from these two developments that the king feared his subjects and had thus cut himself off from them. In such a scenario, the people would surely fear and suspect François. He proposed that to remedy this, the king dismiss his guard and then convene an Estates General. He further challenged the methods of government employed by Guise and Lorraine, critiquing their religious policy. Coligny begged the king to endorse the petition he had received.

Coligny was followed in his speech by the other members of the conseil privé.

=== Speech of the duc de Guise ===
Then Guise, feeling himself personally attacked by Coligny's earlier speech spoke up in his own defence in a personal capacity. He retorted to the first point Coligny had raised, arguing that after the recent troubles where arms had been assumed against the king, it was a necessary precaution for his person to be guarded. While those who had assumed arms claimed they were doing so to assault the king's ministers and not François himself, Guise challenged this, arguing that he and his brother had been only instruments of the king's will and had not offended any persons. He and his brother had inherited a difficult position from the government of Henri II, with massive debts, thus they had little choice but to disband useless troops and defer salaries.

Guise observed that the petitions Coligny had presented were unsigned. Coligny apologised for this but explained that it was not possible to gain signatures without the right of assembly for Protestants. He added that if François afforded such rights he could get 50,000 signatures for the petitions from Normandie alone. The duc de Guise rejoindered that the king could easily assemble a counter-petition that featured 1,000,000 signatures, first among which would be his own.

The duc explained that for his part, he did not have to question matters of faith (which he stated that he left to the theologians as he was only a 'simple soldier') and that all the councils in the world would not separate him from his devotion to the holy sacrament. By this means, Guise affirmed to Catholics who were frustrated by the more tolerant royal religious policy that they had a man at court. He also took a position of neutrality on the calling of an Estates, saying he would leave such a decision for François. It took all the diplomacy of others present at the meeting to stop an explosion between Coligny and Guise.

=== Speech of the cardinal de Lorraine ===
Lorraine followed his brother in speaking on 24 August. He took a more measured approach to Coligny than did his brother. He challenged whether the intentions of the petitioners was as peaceable as they protested it to be. He further enquired ironically as to whether the king was to adopt the Protestant faith. Lorraine mused to Coligny that the majority of the requests of the king's subjects took the form of 'defamatory libels' and that he had in his personal collection 22 that were written against him.

He argued at the Assembly, that it was his position that those, unarmed French that went to Protestant services, sung psalms and avoided attendance of mass should not be pursued by the state. He expressed his remorse as a cardinal that in the past such people had been subject to execution. Despite this, open toleration of Protestantism (either embodied by the granting of churches of the right of assembly) was not acceptable to Lorraine, as this would be to indicate François' approval of heresy, which would surely see him damned. He observed that the Protestants protestations of obedience to the crown only seemed to apply when the king was of the same religion as them. It would be the duty of the bishops and priests to win the Protestants back over to the Catholic faith, meanwhile the baillis and sénéchaux would be responsible for punishing those who took up arms. He voiced his approval for a meeting of the Estates General, more clearly so than did the duc de Guise but showed hesitancy on the prospect of a national church council. An Estates General would afford the king's ministers an opportunity to dispel the slanders against them. Beyond this Guise and Lorraine were driven towards the Estates by the perilous financial position the kingdom found itself in. Lorraine put forward that there should be an investigation into abuses of the church before any church council. After such an investigation had transpired, then a council (either general or national) could be convened to address the problems raised by the investigation at the discretion of the bishops.

After Lorraine's speech, the Assembly was adjourned for the day.

== 25 August ==
=== Voting ===
On 25 August the members of the Assembly met to consider how to proceed. They rejected Coligny's advocacy for the legalisation of Protestantism. Rather instead it would be Lorraine's proposals around which the present chevalier de l'Ordre de Saint-Michel rallied. As such the Assembly thus approved by a majority vote the propositions that an Estates General be summoned, and that a church council be convened. There were certainly present chevaliers such as the Montmorencies and the seigneur d'Andelot who would have preferred a different course. François and Catherine thanked all the delegates for their participation and assured them the government would announce its decision to them shortly.

== 26 August ==
A closing session was held for the Assembly on 26 August. François made it known that he intended to convene an Estates General and a national council of the church (unless agreement could be reached with the Pope, German princes and other parties for a general council). Royal justice against 'heretics' would only be pursued against those judged to be 'insane' going forward. Bishops and royal officers would be obliged to reside in their charges.

== Aftermath ==
=== Legislation of the Assembly ===
On 31 August a royal edict was issued summarising the results of the Assembly. An Estates General was ordered convened. It would be set to meet at Meaux on 10 December, however it would in fact meet at Orléans. In addition, if a general council of the church could not be convened, then a national meeting of the church was to occur the following month on 20 January 1561 composed of the 'bishops, prelates and other churchmen of the kingdom'. Letters patent to this effect were distributed to the various royal officials.

=== Contemporary reactions ===
Reports of the religious results of the Assembly of Notables came to the delight of the English ambassador and fury of the Spanish ambassador.

The Protestants argument against the crown that it refused to take the proper measure required by the youth (or as they considered it minority) of the king to call an Estates General was undermined by the Assembly having taken this step. Nevertheless, the Protestants remained unsatisfied after the Assembly. Advocacy continued for the rights of the princes du sang over that of the Lorraine-Guise princes.

The continued scheming of the Bourbon princes against the crown during the Autumn of 1560 undermined the hopes of the Assembly that it would re-establish an elite consensus. Indeed, the very day of the closing of the Assembly, a messenger in Condé's employ named La Sague was arrested, and found to have incriminating papers in his possession. Under torture he implicated the princes in a new planned uprising. Condé had reached out to the duc de Montmorency and the vidame de Chartres asking for their support. The vidame responded favourably, but unfortunately for him it was his correspondence with Condé and Navarre that La Sague was carrying. He was locked up in the Bastille three days after the closing of the Assembly of Notables. The suppression of this potential rebellion was a great priority for the court as with backers of such birth it represented a much greater priority than that of Amboise had in March. On 30 August after having studied the information revealed by La Sague, François summoned Navarre to bring his brother to court. On 31 October, Condé was finally brought to the court, and put under arrest.

=== Muddled religious policy ===
The religious policy of the crown also remained confused and contradictory. While Lorraine had now indicated there would be toleration of peaceable Protestants, none of the edicts of persecution had been revoked. In November the bishop of Riez appealed to Lorraine to give him clarity, so that he could not be accused of being either too harsh or too lax.

Going forward from the Assembly of Notables, Guise began to see his religious policy as distinct from that being pursued by the crown. In a letter to the Spanish duque de Alba (duke of Alba) in October he explained that he would do what he could to preserve the honour of god and protect the Catholic faith without reference to the king.

=== Winners and losers ===
While the Assembly was a triumph for the policies of Catherine, she remained in partnership with the Lorraine princes in government, she was determined not to disgrace them. The two groups were unified by their shared antipathy towards the king of Navarre and prince de Condé as well as continued disruptions in the provinces. Cloulas argues that the Assembly revealed Catherine's 'statesperson' like qualities, while avoiding while avoiding the humiliation of the Lorraine-Guise.

As had been the design of the Assembly, all speakers expressed their approval for a national council of the clergy. This had been designed to present a unified front for international observers. However it failed to move either the Pope or the king of España on the prospect. The latter of whom sent an extraordinary ambassador to France during September to make his veto to such a project clear.

The parlements frustrated at not having received invites for any of their members issued a secret remonstrance to François by which they argued the Assembly of Notables could not replace the Estates General.

== Sources ==
- Baumgartner, Frederic (1986). Change and Continuity in the French Episcopate: The Bishops and the Wars of Religion 1547-1610.
- Benedict, Philip (2020). Season of Conspiracy: Calvin, the French Reformed Churches, and Protestant Plotting in the Reign of Francis II (1559-1560). American Philosophical Society Press.
- Bourquin, Laurent (2023). "La Monarchie Face aux Factions". Les Guerres de Religion 1559-1610: La Haine des Clans. In Fine Éditions d'art.
- Carpi, Olivia (2012). Les Guerres de Religion (1559-1598): Un Conflit Franco-Français. Ellipses.
- Carroll, Stuart (2011). Martyrs and Murderers: The Guise Family and the Making of Europe. Oxford University Press.
- Christin, Olivier (1999). "From Repression to Pacification: French Royal Policy in the Face of Protestantism". In Benedict, Philip; Marnef, Guido; Nierop, Henk van; Venard, Marc (eds.). Reformation, Revolt and Civil War in France and the Netherlands 1555-1585. Royal Netherlands Academy of Arts and Sciences.
- Cloulas, Ivan (1979). Catherine de Médicis. Fayard.
- Constant, Jean-Marie (1984). Les Guise. Hachette.
- Crété, Liliane (1985). Coligny. Fayard.
- Durot, Éric (2012). François de Lorraine, duc de Guise entre Dieu et le Roi. Classiques Garnier.
- Garrisson, Janine (1991). Guerre Civile et Compromis 1559-1598. Éditions du Seuil.
- Jouanna, Arlette (1998b). "Assemblées des Notables". In Jouanna, Arlette; Boucher, Jacqueline; Biloghi, Dominique; Le Thiec, Guy (eds.). Histoire et Dictionnaire des Guerres de Religion.
- Jouanna, Arlette (1998). "Le Temps des Guerres de Religion en France (1559-1598)". In Jouanna, Arlette; Boucher, Jacqueline; Biloghi, Dominique; Le Thiec, Guy (eds.). Histoire et Dictionnaire des Guerres de Religion.
- Jouanna, Arlette (2021). La France du XVIe Siècle 1483-1598. Presses Universitaires de France.
- Knecht, Robert (1996). The Rise and Fall of Renaissance France. Fontana Press.
- Knecht, Robert (2000). The French Civil Wars. Longman.
- Knecht, Robert (2008). The French Renaissance Court. Yale University Press.
- Knecht, Robert (2010). The French Wars of Religion, 1559-1598. Routledge.
- Knecht, Robert (2014). Catherine de' Medici. Routledge.
- Knecht, Robert (2016). Hero or Tyrant? Henry III, King of France, 1574-1589. Routledge.
- Le Roux, Nicolas (2013). Le Roi, La Cour, L'État de La Renaissance à L'Absolutisme. Champ Vallon.
- Le Roux, Nicolas (2022). 1559-1629 Les Guerres de Religion. Gallimard.
- Mariéjol, Jean H. (1983). La Réforme, la Ligue, l'Édit de Nantes. Tallandier.
- Miquel, Pierre (1980). Les Guerres de Religion. Fayard.
- Pernot, Michel (1987). Les Guerres de Religion en France 1559-1598. Sedes.
- Pitts, Vincent (2012). Henri IV of France: His Reign and Age. Johns Hopkins University Press.
- Roelker, Nancy (1968). Queen of Navarre: Jeanne d'Albret 1528-1572. Harvard University Press.
- Roelker, Nancy (1996). One King, One Faith: The Parlement of Paris and the Religious Reformation of the Sixteenth Century. University of California Press.
- Romier, Lucien (1923). La Conjuration d'Amboise: L'Aurore Sanglante de la Liberté de Conscience, Le Règne et la mort de François II. Perrin et Cie.
- Salmon, J.H.M. (1979). Society in Crisis: France in the Sixteenth Century. Metheun & Co.
- Shimizu, J. (1970). Conflict of Loyalties: Politics and Religion in the Career of Gaspard de Coligny, Admiral of France, 1519–1572. Geneva: Librairie Droz.
- Sutherland, Nicola (1962). The French Secretaries of State in the Age of Catherine de Medici. The Athlone Press.
- Sutherland, Nicola (1980). The Huguenot Struggle for Recognition. Yale University Press.
- Thompson, James (1909). The Wars of Religion in France 1559-1576: The Huguenots, Catherine de Medici and Philip II. Chicago University Press.
