= Rupert Graves =

English actor

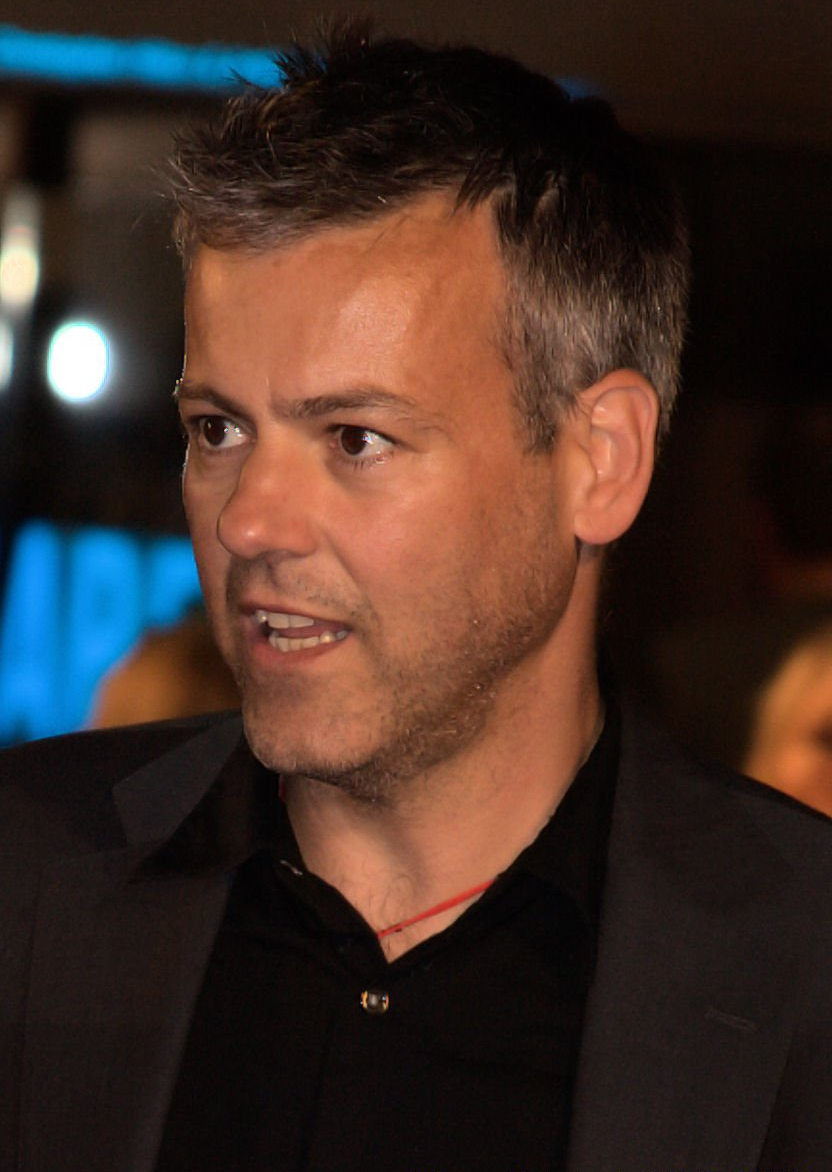
- Graves at the film premiere of Made in Dagenham in 2010
- Born: Weston-super-Mare, Somerset, England
- Occupation: Actor
- Years active: 1978–present
- Website: www.rupert-graves.com

Rupert Graves is an English film, television, and theatre actor. He is known for his roles in A Room with a View, Maurice, The Madness of King George, and The Forsyte Saga. From 2010 to 2017 he starred as DI Lestrade in the BBC television series Sherlock.

== Early life and education ==
Rupert Graves was born in Weston-super-Mare in Somerset, England, to Mary Lousilla (née Roberts) Graves, a travel co-ordinator, and Richard Harding Graves, a music teacher and musician.

Graves was educated at Wyvern Community School.

== Career ==
Graves's first job after leaving school was as a circus clown. He has appeared in more than 25 films and more than 35 television productions. He has also appeared on stage.

He first came to prominence in costume-drama adaptations of E. M. Forster's novels A Room with a View (1985) and Maurice (1987), before appearing in films including A Handful of Dust (1988), The Madness of King George (1994), Different for Girls (1996), and Intimate Relations (1996).

His role in Intimate Relations won him the Best Actor award at the 1996 Montreal World Film Festival. He was also acclaimed for his portrayal of Young Jolyon Forsyte in the television miniseries The Forsyte Saga (2002).

In addition to his screen work, Graves has won acclaim for his stage acting, including roles in Broadway productions, in New York City, of the plays Closer (2000) and The Elephant Man (2002). His notable London theatre credits include his performance as Presley Stray in the original production of Philip Ridley's The Pitchfork Disney (1991) at the Bush Theatre, west London, which won him Best Actor at the 1991 Charrington London Fringe Awards; in Martin Sherman's A Madhouse in Goa (1989) opposite Vanessa Redgrave; and as Eddie in the Peter Hall Company's production of David Rabe's Hurlyburly (1997–98) at the Old Vic and Queen's Theatre, for which he was nominated for the 1998 Laurence Olivier Award for Best Actor.

== Personal life ==
In 1987, Graves met Yvonne, a stained glass artist. They lived together in London, and he helped raise her two daughters. The couple were together for 13 years.

He later married Australian-born production co-ordinator Susie Lewis.

== Filmography ==
=== Film ===
Year	Title	Role	Notes
1985	A Room with a View	Freddy Honeychurch	
1987	Maurice	Alec Scudder	
1988	A Handful of Dust	John Beaver	
1990	The Plot to Kill Hitler	Axel von dem Busche	
1990	The Children	Gerald Ormerod	
1991	Where Angels Fear to Tread	Philip Herriton	
1992	Damage	Martyn Fleming	
1992	The Sheltering Desert	Hermann Korn	
1994	The Madness of King George	Robert Fulke Greville	
1996	Different for Girls	Paul Prentice	
1996	The Innocent Sleep	Alan Terry	
1996	Intimate Relations	Harold Guppy	Montreal World Film Festival – Best Actor
1997	Bent	Officer on train	
1997	Mrs Dalloway	Septimus Warren Smith	
1998	The Soldier's Leap	Christian	Short film
1998	Sweet Revenge	Oliver Knightly	
1999	All My Loved Ones	Nicholas Winton	Original title: Vsichni moji blízcí
1999	Dreaming of Joseph Lees	Joseph Lees	
2000	Room to Rent	Mark	
2002	Extreme Ops	Jeffrey	
2005	Rag Tale	Eddy Taylor	
2005	V for Vendetta	Dominic	
2007	Death at a Funeral	Robert	
2007	Intervention	Mark	
2007	The Waiting Room	George	
2010	Made in Dagenham	Peter Hopkins	
2012	Fast Girls	David Temple	
2015	Bone in the Throat	Rupert	based on Anthony Bourdain's novel
2016	Native	Cane	
2016	Sacrifice	Duncan Guthrie	based on Sharon Bolton's novel
2018	Swimming with Men	Luke	
2019	Horrible Histories: The Movie – Rotten Romans	Governor General Paulinus	
2020	Emma	Mr. Weston	
2021	Smyrna, My Beloved	George Horton	
2022	Dalíland	Captain Moore	
2025	Juliet & Romeo	Prince Escalus	

=== Television ===
Year	Title	Role	Notes
1978	Return of the Saint	Prefect	Episode: "Yesterday's Hero"
1979	The Famous Five	Yan	2 episodes
1981	Vice Versa	Tipping	6 episodes
1982	All for Love	Jim Atkins	Episode: "Mona"
1983	St. Ursula's in Danger	Teddy	
1983	Good and Bad at Games	Guthrie	
1984	Puccini	Tonio	
1987	Fortunes of War	Simon Boulderstone	3 episodes
1991	A Private Affair	Milton	
1992	Inspector Morse	Billy	Episode: "Happy Families"
1993	Screen One	Neil	Episode: "Royal Celebration"
1994	Doomsday Gun	Jones	
1994	Open Fire	David Martin	
1995	Harry	Dominic Collier	Series 2, Episode 6
1996	The Great War: 1914–1918	Various voices	3 episodes
1996	The Tenant of Wildfell Hall	Arthur Huntingdon	3 episodes
1999	The Blonde Bombshell	Dennis Hamilton	
1999	Cleopatra	Octavian	
2000	Take a Girl Like You	Patrick Standish	TV movie
2002	The Forsyte Saga	Young Jolyon Forsyte	
2003	The Forsyte Saga: To Let	Young Jolyon Forsyte	4 episodes
2003	Charles II: The Power & the Passion	George Villiers, Duke of Buckingham	4 episodes
2004	Pride	Linus	Voice only
2005	Spooks	William Sampson	Series 4, Episode 2
2005	A Waste of Shame	William Shakespeare	
2006	Son of the Dragon	The Lord of the North	
2007	To Be First	Dr. Christiaan Barnard	
2007	Clapham Junction	Robin Cape	
2007	The Dinner Party	Roger	
2008	Ashes to Ashes	Danny Moore	Series 1, Episode 2
2008	Waking the Dead	Colonel John Garrett	2 episodes
2008	Midnight Man	Daniel Cosgrave	3 episodes
2008	God on Trial	Mordechai	
2008	Marple: A Pocket Full of Rye	Lance Fortescue	
2009	The Good Times Are Killing Me	Lexy	
2009–2011	Garrow's Law	Sir Arthur Hill	12 episodes
2010	Wallander	Alfred Harderberg	Episode: "The Man Who Smiled"
2010	Lewis	Alec Pickman	Episode: "Falling Darkness"
2010	Law & Order: UK	John Smith	Episode: "Defence"
2010	Single Father	Stuart	3 episodes
2010	New Tricks	Adrian Levene	Episode: "Fashion Victim"
2010–2017	Sherlock	D.I. Lestrade	13 episodes
2011	Case Sensitive	Mark Bretherick	2 episodes
2011	Scott & Bailey	Nick Savage	5 episodes
2011	Death in Paradise	James Lavender	Series 1 episode 1
2012	Putin, Russia & The West	Narrator	4 episodes
2012	Terror at Sea: The Sinking of the Concordia	Narrator	
2012	The Hunt for bin Laden	Narrator	
2012	Air Force One Is Down	Arkady Dragutin	2 Episodes
2012	Doctor Who	Riddell	Series 7, Episode 2: "Dinosaurs on a Spaceship"
2012	Secret State	Felix Durrell	4 episodes
2013	The White Queen	Lord Stanley	6 episodes
2014	Turks & Caicos	Stirling Rogers	
2014	Salting the Battlefield	Stirling Rogers	
2014	The Crimson Field	Maj. Edward Crecy	Episode 2
2014	Last Tango in Halifax	Gary	Series 3
2015	Valentine's Kiss	Nicholas Whiteley	
2016	The Nightmare Worlds of H. G. Wells	Hapley	Episode: "The Moth"
2016	The Family	John Warren	
2017	12 Monkeys	Sebastian	Series 3, Episode 8
2018	Krypton	Ter-El	Episode: "Pilot"
2019	The War of the Worlds	Frederick	2 episodes
2020	Riviera	Gabriel Hirsch	8 episodes
2021	McDonald & Dodds	Gordon Elmwood	Episode: "The Man Who Wasn't There
2022	Doc Martin	Arthur Collins	Episode: "Our Last Summer"
2023	The Burning Girls	Simon Harper	Main role
2025	Surface	Henry Huntley	7 episodes
2025	Washington Black	Mr. Goff	Main role
2026	Missed Call	Jason Bradley	Main role

== Theatre ==
Year	Title	Role	Notes
1983	The Killing Of Mr. Toad by David Gooderson	Alistair Graham, Mr. Toad	The King's Head Theatre, London, director David Gooderson
1983, 1984	Sufficient Carbohydrate by Dennis Potter	Clayton Vosper	Hampstead Theatre and Albery Theatre, London, director Nancy Meckler
1985	Torch Song Trilogy (Part 2: 'Fugue in a Nursery') by Harvey Fierstein	Alan	Albery Theatre, London, director Robert Allan Ackerman
1986	Amadeus by Peter Shaffer	Wolfgang Amadeus Mozart	Theatr Clwyd, director Simon Callow
1987	The Importance of Being Earnest by Oscar Wilde	Algernon Moncrieff	Crucible Theatre, Sheffield, director Clare Venables
1986–87	Candida by George Bernard Shaw	Marchbanks	The King's Head Theatre, London, director Frank Hauser (director)
1988	'Tis Pity She's a Whore by John Ford (dramatist)	Giovanni	Royal National Theatre (Olivier), London, director Alan Ayckbourn
1989	The History of Tom Jones by Henry Fielding, adapted by Andrew Wickes	Tom Jones	Watford Palace Theatre, director Matthew Francis
1989	A Madhouse in Goa by Martin Sherman	David, Barnaby Grace	Lyric Theatre (Hammersmith) and Apollo Theatre, London, director Robert Allan Ackerman
1991	The Pitchfork Disney by Philip Ridley	Presley Stray	Bush Theatre, London, director Matthew Lloyd
1992	A Midsummer Night's Dream by William Shakespeare	Lysander	Royal National Theatre (Olivier), London, director Robert Lepage
1994	Toyer by Gardner McKay	Peter Matson	Redgrave Theatre, Farnham, director Wyn Jones
1995	Design for Living by Noël Coward	Otto	Gielgud Theatre, London, director Sean Mathias
1996	Les Enfants du Paradis by Jacques Prévert, adapted by Simon Callow	Baptiste	Barbican Centre, London, director Simon Callow
1997, 1998	Hurlyburly by David Rabe	Eddie	Peter Hall Company at the Old Vic and Queen's Theatre, London, director Wilson Milam
1998	The Iceman Cometh by Eugene O'Neill	Don Parrit	Almeida Theatre, London, director Howard Davies (director)
1999	Closer by Patrick Marber	Dan	Music Box Theater, Broadway, director Patrick Marber
2000, 2000–01	The Caretaker by Harold Pinter	Mick	Yvonne Arnaud Theatre, Guildford, and Comedy Theatre, London, director Patrick Marber
2001	Speak Truth To Power: Voices From Beyond The Dark by Ariel Dorfman	Third Voice	Playhouse Theatre, London, director Gari Jones
2002	The Elephant Man by Bernard Pomerance	Dr. Frederick Treves	Royale Theatre, Broadway, director Sean Mathias
2003	A Woman of No Importance by Oscar Wilde	Lord Illingworth	Theatre Royal Haymarket, London, director Adrian Noble
2004	Dumb Show by Joe Penhall	Greg	Royal Court Theatre, London, director Terry Johnson (dramatist)
2006	The Exonerated by Jessica Blank and Erik Jensen	Kerry	Riverside Studios, London, director Bob Balaban
2018	Pinter Five – The Room/Victoria Station/Family Voices by Harold Pinter	Bert Hudd/Driver/Voice Three	Harold Pinter Theatre, London, director Patrick Marber

and primary archive sources.
