= The Exorcist (play) =

2012 play by John Pielmeier

- Written by: John Pielmeier
- Based on: The Exorcist by William Peter Blatty
- Characters: Chris; Father Merrin; Father Karras; Regan; Dr. Strong; Dr. Klein; Father Joe; Burke
- Genre: Horror

Premiere
- Date: 3 July 2012
- Place: Geffen Playhouse, Los Angeles

The Exorcist is a play by John Pielmeier based on the novel of the same name by William Peter Blatty and is part of The Exorcist franchise. The story revolves around a young girl, Regan MacNeil, who is possessed by a demonic spirit. Her mother, Chris, seeks out the church to perform an exorcism.

== Production history ==
In February 2008, American playwright John Pielmeier expressed an interest in adapting William Peter Blatty's novel of the same name into a play and soon met with Blatty. He then began working on a script for the play, in which the first draft was completed in ten days.

=== Los Angeles premiere (2012) ===
The play had its world premiere at the Gil Gates Theater at the Geffen Playhouse in Los Angeles from July 3 until August 12, 2012. It was directed by John Doyle, designed by Scott Pask, lighting design by Jane Cox, sound design by Dan Moses Schreier with music by Sir John Tavener. Teller (of magicians Penn & Teller) served as a creative consultant. The production starred Brooke Shields as Chris, Richard Chamberlain as Father Merrin and David Wilson Barnes as Father Damien.

=== UK productions (2016–19) ===
==== Birmingham (2016) ====
In 2016 the play made its UK premiere at the Birmingham Repertory Theatre, produced in association with Bill Kenwright (by arrangement with Ben Sprecher and Stuart Snyder) and ran from 21 October to 5 November. The production was directed by Sean Mathias, designed by Anna Fleischle, lighting design by Tim Mitchell, music and sound design by Adam Cork, video and projection design by Duncan McLean with illusions by Ben Hart. The cast featured Jenny Seagrove as Chris, Peter Bowles as Father Merrin, Adam Garcia as Father Damien and Clare Louise Connolly as Regan. Sir Ian McKellen provided the pre-recorded voice of the demon.

==== West End (2017–18) ====
The Birmingham production transferred to the Phoenix Theatre in London's West End from 20 October 2017 for a strictly limited run until 10 March 2018. Seagrove, Bowles, Garcia, and Connolly returned to production with the majority of the Birmingham cast.

==== UK and Ireland tour (2019) ====
Following the London run, a UK and Ireland tour began in September 2019 at the Theatre Royal, Windsor before touring to the Theatre Royal, Glasgow, New Wimbledon Theatre, Regent Theatre, Stoke-on-Trent, Milton Keynes Theatre, The Alexandra, Birmingham, Opera House Manchester, Gaiety Theatre, Dublin, King's Theatre, Edinburgh, Eden Court Theatre, Inverness and His Majesty's Theatre, Aberdeen. The production starred Sophie Ward as Chris and Paul Nicholas as Merrin.

== Characters and cast ==
Character	Los Angeles	Birmingham	West End	UK and Ireland tour
Character	2012	2016	2017	2019
Chris MacNeil	Brooke Shields	Jenny Seagrove	Jenny Seagrove	Sophie Ward
Father Merrin	Richard Chamberlain	Peter Bowles	Peter Bowles	Paul Nicholas
Father Damien Karras	David Wilson Barnes	Adam Garcia	Adam Garcia	Ben Caplan
Regan MacNeil	Emily Yetter	Clare Louise Connolly	Clare Louise Connolly	Susannah Edgley
Doctor Strong	Stephen Bogardus	Todd Boyce	Todd Boyce	Stephen Billington
Doctor Klein	Tom Neils	Mitchell Mullen	Mitchell Mullen	Patrick Toomey
Father Joe	Manoel Felciano	Joseph Wilkins	Elliot Harper	Joseph Wilkins
Burke Dennings	Harry Groener	Tristram Wymark	Tristram Wymark	Tristram Wymark
The Demon	—N/a	Ian McKellen (voice)	Ian McKellen (voice)	Ian McKellen (voice)
Carla	Roslyn Ruff	—N/a	—N/a	—N/a

== Critical reception ==
The Los Angeles production received mixed reviews from the critics, but the audiences responded enthusiastically. Due to this, Pielmeier has stated that he has made a major re-write on the script in preparation for a second production.

Birmingham and West End production received mixed to positive reviews from the critics and audiences.
