= Bent (1997 film) =

- Theatrical release poster
- Directed by: Sean Mathias
- Screenplay by: Martin Sherman
- Based on: Bent by Martin Sherman
- Produced by: Michael Solinger; Dixie Linder; Martin Sherman
- Starring: Lothaire Bluteau; Clive Owen; Brian Webber; Ian McKellen; Mick Jagger
- Cinematography: Yorgos Arvanitis
- Edited by: Isabelle Lorente
- Music by: Philip Glass
- Production company: Channel Four Films
- Distributed by: FilmFour Distributors
- Release dates: 26 November 1997 (USA); 6 March 1998 (UK)
- Running time: 105 minutes
- Countries: United Kingdom; Japan
- Language: English
- Box office: $496,059

Bent is a 1997 drama film directed by Sean Mathias, based on the 1979 play of the same name by Martin Sherman, who also wrote the screenplay. It revolves around the persecution of homosexuals in Nazi Germany after the murder of SA leader Ernst Röhm on the Night of the Long Knives.

== Plot ==
Max is a promiscuous gay man living in 1930s Berlin. He is at odds with his wealthy family because of his homosexuality. One evening, much to the resentment of his boyfriend, Rudy, Max brings home a handsome Sturmabteilung (SA) man. Unfortunately, he does so on the Night of the Long Knives, when Adolf Hitler ordered the assassination of upper echelon SA corps. The Sturmabteilung man is discovered and killed by SS men in Max and Rudy's apartment, and the two have to flee Berlin.

Max's Uncle Freddie has organised new papers for Max, but Max refuses to leave his boyfriend behind. As a result, Max and Rudy are found and arrested by the Gestapo and put on a train headed for Dachau. On the train, Rudy is brutally beaten to death by the guards. As Rudy calls out to Max when he is taken away, Max lies to the guards, denying he is gay. In the camp, Max falls in love with Horst, who shows him the dignity that lies in acknowledging one's beliefs. After Horst's death, Max finds the courage to be true to himself and takes his own life.

== Cast ==
- Clive Owen as Max
- Lothaire Bluteau as Horst
- Ian McKellen as Uncle Freddie
- Brian Webber II as Rudy
- Nikolaj Coster-Waldau as Wolf
- Mick Jagger as Greta
- Jude Law as Stormtrooper
- Rupert Graves as Captain
- Paul Bettany as Captain
- Rachel Weisz as Prostitute

== Reception ==
=== Critical reception ===
Bent has an overall approval rating of 74% on Rotten Tomatoes based on 23 reviews, with a weighted average of 6.4/10. The site's consensus reads: "Bent juggles heavy topics with style, though its heavy-handedness at times feels more like exploitation than exploration".

Roger Ebert gave the film two out of four stars, criticizing the depiction of the relationship between Max and Horst as inauthentic and driven by film tropes, writing: "This [sex] scene works like the chase scene: It drops out of the drama to stand alone as entertainment–as eroticism. A better film would have found a way to absorb the sexuality into the underlying theme; both scenes are crowd-pleasers, and so is a closing sequence which seems staged more as a noble tableaux than as drama at all."

The film grossed $496,059 in the United States and Canada and $46,697 in the United Kingdom.

=== Awards ===
- 1997: Won Award of the Youth at the Cannes Film Festival
- 1998: Won Best Feature Film in the Torino International Gay & Lesbian Film Festival

== See also ==
- List of Holocaust films
