= Martin Sherman (dramatist) =

American dramatist (born 1938)

- Born: Martin Gerald Sherman; December 22, 1938 (age 87); Philadelphia, Pennsylvania, U.S.
- Education: Boston University College of Fine Arts; BFA, Dramatic Arts (1960) the Actors Studio
- Occupations: Playwright, screenwriter
- Writing career
- Notable works: Bent (1980); Rose (2000); The Boy from Oz (2003)
- Notable awards: Dramatists Guild; Hull-Warriner Award (1980); Tony Award nominations: • Bent (1980) • The Boy from Oz (2003); Laurence Olivier Award nomination: • Rose (2000)

Martin Gerald Sherman (born December 22, 1938) is an American dramatist, screenwriter and actor best known for his 20-stage plays which have been produced in over 60 countries. He rose to fame in 1979 with the production of his play Bent, which explores the persecution of homosexuals during the Holocaust. Bent was a Tony nominee for Best Play in 1980 and won the Dramatists Guild's Hull-Warriner Award. It was adapted by Sherman for a major motion picture in 1997 and later by independent sources as a ballet in Brazil. Sherman is Jewish and openly gay, and many of his works dramatize "outsiders," dealing with the discrimination and marginalization of minorities whether "gay, female, foreign, disabled, different in religion, class or color." He has lived and worked in London since 1980.

== Life and career ==
=== Early life ===
Sherman was an only child, born in Philadelphia, Pennsylvania, to Russian Jewish immigrants, Julia (née Shapiro) and Joseph T. Sherman, an attorney. Growing up in Camden, New Jersey, he was first introduced to the theater at age six, when he saw a pre-Broadway version of Guys and Dolls (1950). Sherman's parents encouraged his passion. In an interview with London Times writer Sheridan Morley in 1983, Sherman recalled, "At 12 I joined the Mae Desmond Children's Players and went all around Pennsylvania being a tall dwarf in Snow White and the Seven Dwarfs." As a young teen, Sherman despised school, but consoled himself by often taking the bus into Philadelphia to see plays. "I was the only kid in junior high school to have seen Camino Real," he told interviewer Matt Wolf.

In 1956 Sherman enrolled at Boston University College of Fine Arts, where he earned a BFA in dramatic arts. Upon graduating in 1960, he moved to New York City, where he studied at the Actors Studio under the legendary director Harold Clurman. Sherman credits this experience with shaping his technique as a playwright, explaining "all my plays are written for actors". After spending several years in New York, Sherman was appointed playwright in residence at Mills College in Oakland, California, where his rock musical, A Solitary Thing, premiered in 1963.

=== Professional career ===
Sherman returned to New York City in the mid-1960s where he wrote Fat Tuesday (1966), Next Year in Jerusalem (1968), and The Night Before Paris (1969). Things Went Badly in Westphalia—which takes its name from a line in Voltaire's Candide— was next, and became Sherman's first published play when the dramatic rock musical was included in The Best Short Plays of 1970. In the 1970s, Sherman traveled to London where he worked with the founding members of the Gay Sweatshop.

After more than a decade of writing plays, Sherman found widespread fame in 1979 with his first blockbuster hit, Bent. First produced at the Royal Court Theatre in London starring Ian McKellen, Tom Bell and Jeff Rawle, the play tells the story of Max, a gay man in Berlin during the Weimar Republic. After Max and his boyfriend are forced to flee the city following the Night of the Long Knives, the two live in hiding for two years before being captured by the Gestapo and sent to a concentration camp. The play was considered extremely controversial. Despite the uproar, Bent transferred to Broadway, where it starred Richard Gere and became an instant hit, being nominated for a Tony Award. Following the success of this production, Sherman moved to London.

Despite his status as an expatriate, Sherman continued to write successfully for both the British and the American stage. He had great success with his re-write of the book for the musical The Boy from Oz, based on Peter Allen's life and career, earning him a second Tony nomination. He has had a number of plays staged in the West End, including Messiah (1982) with Maureen Lipman, A Madhouse In Goa (1989) with Vanessa Redgrave and Rupert Graves, When She Danced (1991) with Vanessa Redgrave, Oleg Menshikov and Frances de la Tour and Onassis (2010) with Robert Lindsay. His play Some Sunny Day premiered at the Hampstead Theatre in 1996, with Rupert Everett and Corin Redgrave. He found success in the genre of one-woman plays with Rose, which was nominated for a Laurence Olivier Award for Best New Play when it premiered at the National Theatre, London in 1999 starring Olympia Dukakis; the show transferred to Broadway the following year, where Dukakis reprised her role. His most recent play, Gently Down The Stream, premiered at the Public Theatre in New York in 2017, directed by Sean Mathias and starring Harvey Fierstein.

In 2003, Franco Zeffirelli directed Sherman's adaptation of Luigi Pirandello's Right You Are, if You Think So. The pair retitled the work Absolutely! {perhaps} when it premiered at Wyndham's Theatre in London's West End where it was nominated that year for a Laurence Olivier Award for Best Revival. Following that critical acclaim, Sherman also premiered stage adaptations of the novels A Passage to India by E.M. Forster and The Roman Spring of Mrs. Stone by Tennessee Williams. He also found success as a screenwriter in the 1990s. Sherman adapted Bent for the big screen in 1997 with the help of director Sean Mathias and starring such actors as Clive Owen, Ian McKellen, and Mick Jagger.

Other film titles include Clothes in the Wardrobe in 1992 (released in the US as The Summer House, 1993), an adaptation of Alice Thomas Ellis's novel, with Jeanne Moreau, Joan Plowright, Julie Walters and Lena Headey, Alive and Kicking (1996), directed by Nancy Meckler, with Jason Flemyng, Antony Sher, Dorothy Tutin and Bill Nighy, as well as a collaboration with Franco Zeffirelli on Callas Forever (2002), a biographical film of opera star Maria Callas, with Fanny Ardant and Jeremy Irons. Sherman also wrote The Roman Spring of Mrs. Stone (2003), a made-for-TV movie directed by Robert Allan Ackerman, with Helen Mirren, Anne Bancroft and Olivier Martinez, and Mrs Henderson Presents (2005), the tale of an eccentric World War I widow, Laura Henderson, who buys the old Windmill Theatre in London and relaunches it as a venue for female all nude revues. The latter starred Judi Dench, Bob Hoskins, and Christopher Guest, and was directed by Stephen Frears. It earned Sherman a nomination for a British Academy of Film and Television Arts (BAFTA) Award for Best Original Screenplay.

Aged 87, he made his professional acting debut in his own play I'll Be Seeing You.

=== Private Passions ===
His life story and the role played by music was recounted on BBC Radio 3 in October 2025 in the series Private Passions, hosted by Michael Berkeley.

== Works ==
=== Theatre productions ===
- A Solitary Thing, with music by Stanley Silverman, Oakland, California, Mills College, September 9, 1963.
- Fat Tuesday, New York, Herbert Berghof Playwrights Foundation, 1966.
- Next Year in Jerusalem, New York, Herbert Berghof Playwrights Foundation, June 8, 1968.
- Change, (libretto), New York, BMI Music Theatre Workshop, 1969.
- The Night Before Paris, New York, Actors Studio, 1969; Edinburgh, Traverse Theatre, 1970.
- Things Went Badly in Westphalia, Storrs, University of Connecticut, 1971.
- Passing By, New York, Playwrights Horizons, March 5, 1974; London, Almost Free Theatre, June 9, 1975.
- New York! New York!, contributor, New York, Playwrights Horizons, April 26, 1975.
- Cracks, Waterford, CT, National Playwrights Conference, Eugene O'Neill Theater Center, July 31, 1975; Oldham, Coliseum Theatre, October 10, 1981.
- Rio Grande, New York, Playwrights Horizons, November 11, 1976.
- Blackout, New York, Ensemble Studio Theatre, 1978.
- Bent Waterford, CT, National Playwrights Conference, Eugene O'Neill Theater Center, August 4, 1978; London, Royal Court Theatre, May 3, 1979; New York, New Apollo Theatre, December 2, 1979.
- Messiah, London, Hampstead Theatre, December 9, 1982; New York, Manhattan Theatre Club, December 11, 1984.
- When She Danced, Guildford, UK, Yvonne Arnaud Theatre, November 27, 1985; New York, Playwrights Horizon, February 19, 1990.
- A Madhouse in Goa, London, Lyric Theatre, Hammersmith, April 28, 1989; New York, Second Stage, November 18, 1997—comprises A Tale for a King and Keeps Rainin' All the Time.
- Some Sunny Day, London, Hampstead Theatre, April 11, 1996.
- Rose, London, Royal National Theatre, June 24, 1999.
- Absolutely! {perhaps} (adapted from Right You Are, if You Think So by Luigi Pirandello), Wyndham Theatre, London, UK, 2003.
- A Passage to India (adapted from the novel by E.M. Forster), Brooklyn Academy of Music, New York, NY, 2004.
- Aristo, Chichester Festival Theatre, West Sussex, UK, September 11, 2008.
- Onassis (formerly Aristo), Novello Theatre, London, UK, October 12, 2010.
- Gently Down the Stream, The Public Theater, New York, NY, March 14, 2017

=== Films ===
- Alive and Kicking aka Indian Summer, Channel Four Films, 1997
- Clothes in the Wardrobe, (adapted from the novel by Alice Thomas Ellis), BBC Films, 1992; US Release as The Summer House, 1993
- Bent, Channel Four Films, 1997
- Mrs Henderson Presents, 2005
- Callas Forever, (with Franco Zeffirelli), 2002

=== Television ===
- Don't Call Me Mama Anymore, CBS, 1972
- The Roman Spring of Mrs. Stone (adapted from the novel by Tennessee Williams), Showtime Networks, 2003

=== Acting roles ===
- Indian Summer (1996)

=== Publications ===
- Bent, S. French, 1979
- Messiah, Amber Lane, 1982
- Cracks, S. French, 1986
- When She Danced, Amber Lane, 1988; S. French, 1988
- A Madhouse in Goa, Amber Lane, 1989; S. French, 1998
- Some Sunny Day, Amber Lane, 1996
- Rose, Methuen, 1999
- "Things Went Badly in Westphalia," in The Best Short Plays of 1970, 1970
- "Passing By," in Gay Plays, Volume 1, 1984
