= A Madhouse in Goa =

Play by Martin Sherman

A Madhouse in Goa is a play by Martin Sherman written in two parts – the first act is titled "A Table for a King", the second, "Keeps Rainin’ all the Time". A Madhouse in Goa’s first act takes place in the year 1966 on the Greek island of Corfu, with the second act set in the year 1986 on the volcanic Greek island of Santorini.

== Synopsis ==
The first act of Sherman's play, "A Table for a King", is a narrative vignette of the experiences of David, a gay, Jewish traveler from America staying at the Kistos Inn on Corfu. There he meets and befriends Mrs. Honey, a talkative widow from Mississippi, who is eventually betrayed by David and blackmailed by the owner of the inn to give up her table for the visiting king of Greece.

The second act of A Madhouse in Goa, "Keeps Rainin' all the Time", is set 20 years after the first act, and reveals that David's real name is Daniel Hosani. Daniel became a famous author after publishing a novel centered around the events within the first act of the play, but eventually fell from popularity and succumbed to the effects of heavy drug usage, drinking, and stroke, becoming aphasic. His legal guardian, Heather, was also present at the Kistos Inn 20 years prior with Daniel and knows that his book does not tell the whole truth of what had actually transpired, distorting and white-washing the narrative to make it more appealing to readers. Dying from cancer, Heather arranges to sell the rights of Daniel's book to a Hollywood film producer seeking to adapt the novel into a film musical. Heather arranges for the money made from the movie deal to be donated to a selection of humanitarian organizations, only for the deal to never be realized.

== Characters ==
=== "A Table for a King" ===
- David: early 20s, American
- Mrs. Honey: early 60s, American
- Costos: 18, Greek
- Nikos: 30s, Greek

=== "Keeps Rainin' all the Time" ===
- Daniel Hosani: late 40s, American
- Oliver: late 40s, British
- Heather: late 40s, American
- Dylan: Heather’s son, 19, American
- Aliki: mid-20s
- Barnaby Grace: late 20s, American

== Relevance to LGBTQ Theatre ==
As an openly gay Jewish man, Sherman often writes characters who are marginalized from society, dramatizing the "other"- societal outsiders identified as such due to their being gay, female, foreign, disabled, different in religion, class, or color. The cast of characters within Sherman's A Madhouse in Goa showcases the intersectional element of his writing, featuring LGBTQ individuals, women, foreigners, and a disabled man, while the plot provides representation of the struggles faced by marginalized LGBTQ people in his depiction of David/Daniel, as this character is disowned by his family for being gay and experiences alienation from others due to his sexuality. The popularity of A Madhouse in Goa within the realm of theatre is supported by the noteworthy casts that have assumed roles within the play, but its relevance to the genre of LGBTQ theatre is supported by the play's incorporation of characters that could be identified as members of LGBTQ community. Tied intrinsically to the genre of LGBTQ theatre due to its content and subject matter, A Madhouse in Goa not only highlights issues faced by LGBTQ individuals, it is also authored by Martin Sherman, a playwright whose history is steeped in gay theatre

== Critical reception ==
In regards to this work's critical reception, the responses to Sherman’s A Madhouse in Goa tend to vary, with some American critics describing the play as listless and sardonic, while others describe the play as tenacious and enthralling. Sherman wrote A Madhouse in Goa to reflect his own particular fears regarding the current state of the world at the time of the play's creation in 1989. With these concerns informing the narrative of A Madhouse in Goa, its plot addresses atrocities plaguing the global community, including the AIDS crisis, terrorism, political unrest, nuclear fallout, and environmental issues. Sherman’s play has been characterized as satirical, providing commentary upon the consequences of moral blindness and its effects upon the individual as well as the global population, and although most reviewers agree that the humorous aspects of A Madhouse in Goa translate well to audiences, the numerous cataclysmic events on the precipice of eruption within this play cause some critics to remark that the plot comes across as unfocused and overwhelming.

== Productions ==
=== Premier Production ===
The first performance of A Madhouse in Goa took place on April 28, 1989, at the Lyric Theatre in Hammersmith, England, directed by Robert Allan Ackerman.

==== Cast ====
- David/Barnaby Grace: Rupert Graves
- Mrs. Honey/Heather: Vanessa Redgrave
- Costos/Dylan: Ian Sears
- Nikos/Oliver: Larry Lamb
- Daniel Hosani: Arthur Dingam
- Aliki: Francesca Fontan

=== United States Performance ===
The first performance of A Madhouse in Goa within the United States took place on November 17, 1997, at the McGinn-Cazale Theater in New York City. This play was produced by The Second Stage Theater, directed by Nicholas Martin.

==== Cast ====
- David/Barnaby Grace: Rick Stear
- Mrs. Honey/Heather: Judith Ivey
- Costos/Dylan: Mark Klein Lewis
- Nikos/Oliver: Daniel Gerrol
- Daniel Hosani: Russ Thacker
- Aliki: Denise Faye
