= John Pielmeier =

American playwright and screenwriter (born 1949)

John Pielmeier (born February 23, 1949) is an American playwright, screenwriter and novelist.

== Life and career ==
Pielmeier was born in Altoona, Pennsylvania, the son of Louise (Blackburn) and Len Pielmeier. He was raised Catholic. He earned a Bachelor of Arts degree from the Catholic University of America in 1970 and a Master of Fine Arts degree from Pennsylvania State University in 1978. He began his career as an actor, working with such repertory companies as Actors Theater of Louisville and the Guthrie Theater.

In 1976, Pielmeier's first play, A Chosen Room, was produced in Minneapolis. Three years later, Agnes of God was performed in a staged reading at the O'Neill National Playwrights' Conference in Waterford, Connecticut and won the 1979 Great American Play Contest. A full production was mounted for the Humana Festival of New American Plays at the Actors Theatre of Louisville in 1980, and the Broadway production opened in March 1982 at the Music Box Theatre, where it ran for 599 performances. His screenplay for the 1985 screen adaptation earned him a nomination for the Writers Guild of America Award for Best Screenplay Based on Material from Another Medium.

Pielmeier has written extensively for the stage, but his later work never achieved the success he experienced with Agnes of God. On Broadway, The Boys of Winter (1985) and Sleight of Hand (1987) both ran for 31 previews and 9 performances, and Voices in the Dark (1999) ran for 12 previews and 64 performances. For the latter work, Pielmeier won the Edgar from the Mystery Writers of America for Best Mystery Play. Other plays include Courage, a one-man show about J. M. Barrie that was filmed by Kentucky Educational Television; Young Rube, a musical based on the early years of cartoonist/inventor Rube Goldberg; Willi, a one-man show based on the speeches of mountaineer Willi Unsoeld, a member of the first American expedition to reach the summit of Mount Everest; and The Exorcist, a play based on the novel of the same name by William Peter Blatty.

In 1983, Pielmeier penned the television movie Choices of the Heart, about murdered American missionaries in El Salvador, for which he received the Christopher Award, the Humanitas Award, a Writers Guild of America nomination, and an honorary Doctorate of Letters from St. Edward's University in Austin, Texas. Additional television credits include The Shell Seekers (1989), The Stranger Within (1990), An Inconvenient Woman (1991), Through the Eyes of a Killer (1992), The Last P.O.W.? The Bobby Garwood Story (1992), Flowers for Algernon (2000), Sins of the Father (2002), Hitler: The Rise of Evil (2003), Sybil (2007), The Capture of the Green River Killer (2008), The Memory Keeper's Daughter (2008), The Pillars of the Earth (2010), and World Without End (2012).

Pielmeier's short story "The Tattle-Tale Heart" appeared in the January/February 2026 issue of Alfred Hitchcock's Mystery Magazine.

Pielmeier has been married to poet and author Irene O'Garden since October 1982. The couple lives in Garrison, New York.

== Publication ==
- Voices In The Dark, Broadway Play Publishing Inc.
- Pielmeier, John; Barrie, J. M. (2017). Hook's tale : being the account of an unjustly villainized pirate written by himself. New York. ISBN 978-1-5011-6105-6. OCLC 961005761.
