= A Private Affair (1993 film) =

Una questione privata
- Directed by: Alberto Negrin
- Screenplay by: Raffaele La Capria (adopted)
- Based on: Una questione privata by Beppe Fenoglio
- Starring: Rupert Graves; Céline Beauvallet; Claudio Mazzenga
- Edited by: Franca Silvi
- Music by: Nicola Piovani
- Release date: 1993
- Running time: 85 minutes
- Country: Italy
- Language: Italian

Una questione privata is a 1993 Italian film directed by Alberto Negrin with a screenplay based on the WWII partisan novel of the same name by Beppe Fenoglio (1963) adapted by Raffaele La Capria. The film stars the young British actor Rupert Graves as Milton, Céline Beauvallet, and Claudio Mazzenga.

== Cast ==
- Rupert Graves as Milton
- Céline Beauvallet as Fulvia
- Claudio Mazzenga as Giorgio
- Fabio Sartor as Tenente
- Pina Cei as La Custode
- Gabriele Benedetti as Riccio
- Rodolfo Corsato as Ferdi
- Franco Fantasia as Colonnello della divisione 'San Marco'
- Pierfrancesco Favino as Ivan
- Domenico Fortunato as Rozzoni
- Massimo Lodolo as Leo
- Susanna Marcomeni as La Maestra
- Alessandro Stefanelli as Hombre
- Luca Zingaretti as Sceriffo
