= Lothaire Bluteau =

Canadian actor (b. 1957)

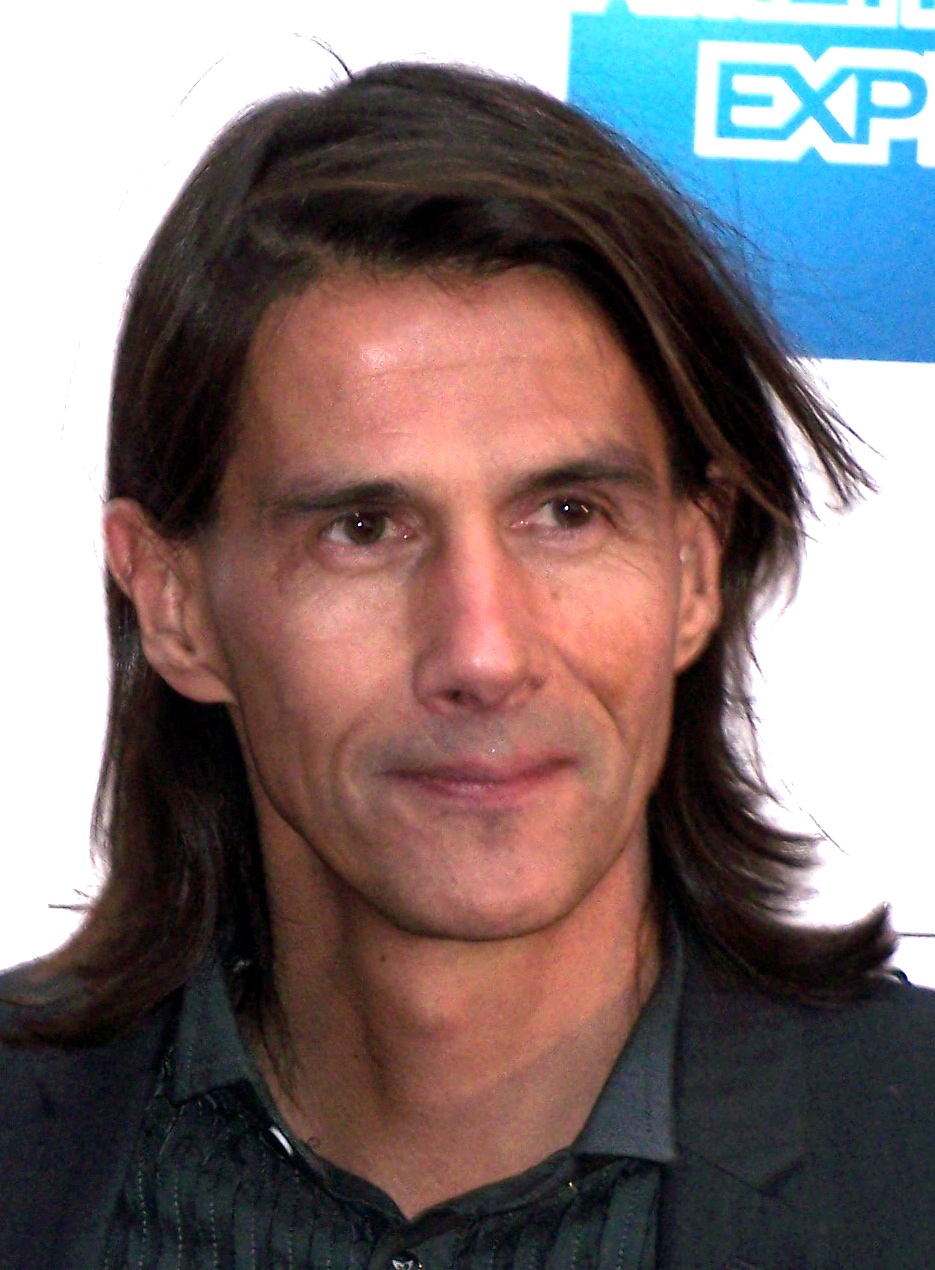
- Bluteau at the Calgary International Film Festival in 2007
- Born: 14 April 1957 (age 69); Montreal, Quebec, Canada
- Education: Conservatoire de musique et d'art dramatique du Québec
- Occupation: Actor
- Years active: 1980–present

Lothaire Bluteau (born 14 April 1957) is a Canadian actor, active in film, theatre, and television. He won the Genie Award for Best Actor in a Leading Role for his portrayal of the title character in Denys Arcand's Jesus of Montreal (1989), with a second nomination for his work in Robert Lepage's The Confessional (1995).

His television work includes the recurring roles of Marcus Alvers on the third season of 24 (2008) and Charles de Marillac on The Tudors (2010), and a starring role as Charles the Bald on Vikings (2015–16).

== Early life ==
Bluteau was born in Montreal in 1957. He initially studied medicine, before enrolling in the Conservatoire de musique et d'art dramatique du Québec. He is fluent in French and English, and has performed in both languages.

== Career ==
Bluteau has worked in theatre, film and television throughout Canada and internationally. He abandoned medicine for the theatre and was first noticed for his performance as a mentally challenged youth in Yves Simoneau's In the Shadow of the Wind (Les Fous de Bassan). After receiving great acclaim for the lead in the stage version of Being at Home with Claude, he won a best actor Genie Award for his performance in Denys Arcand's Oscar-nominated Jésus de Montréal. He has since appeared in Black Robe and Robert Lepage's Le Confessionnal, and his international credits include Orlando (1992) and I Shot Andy Warhol (1996).

He had a recurring role in the third season of the television series 24 as the character Marcus Alvers. In the fourth season of The Tudors, he played Charles de Marillac, the French ambassador to the court of King Henry VIII. In July 2014, it was announced he was cast in the History Channel series Vikings as the 9th century King of France, Charles the Bald.

== Selected filmography ==
- 1980 Les fils de la liberté (TV)
- 1980 Jeune délinquant (TV series, 3 episodes)
- 1983 Just a Game (Rien qu’un jeu) as Disc Jockey
- 1983 Un gars d’la place
- 1984 The Years of Dreams and Revolt (Les années de rêves)
- 1984 Les enfants mal aimés
- 1986 Sonia as Claude
- 1986 Miami Vice (TV series, 1 episode) as Philippe Sagot
- 1987 In the Shadow of the Wind (Les fous de Bassan) as Perceval Brown
- 1988 Bonjour Monsieur Gauguin
- 1988 Mourir
- 1988 La nuit avec Hortense
- 1989 Jesus of Montreal (Jésus de Montréal) as Daniel Coulombe / Jesus
- 1991 Black Robe as Father Paul LaForgue
- 1991 The Persistence of Memory
- 1992 Orlando as The Khan
- 1992 The Silent Touch
- 1992 Mrs. 'Arris Goes to Paris (TV movie) as Andre
- 1995 The Confessional (Le confessionnal) as Pierre LaMontagne
- 1995 Other Voices, Other Rooms as Randolph Skully
- 1996 I Shot Andy Warhol as Maurice Girodias
- 1997 Nostromo (TV miniseries, 4 episodes) as Martin Decoud
- 1996 Bent as Horst
- 1998 Conquest as Pincer Bedier
- 1998 Animals as Young Laurent
- 1998 Shot Through the Heart (TV movie) as Zijah
- 1999 Senso unico as Francesco
- 1999 Law & Order: Special Victims Unit (TV series, 1 episode, "Sophomore Jinx") as Professor James Henri Rousseau
- 1999 Restless Spirits (TV movie) as Charles Nungesser
- 2000 Urbania as Bill
- 2000 Oz (TV series, 1 episode) as Guillaume Tarrant
- 2001 Solitude as Brother Bernard
- 2001 Law & Order: Criminal Intent (TV series, 1 episode, "Enemy Within") as Richard "Rick" Zainer
- 2002 Dead Heat as Tony LaRoche
- 2002 Snow Dogs as Mack
- 2002 Julie Walking Home as Alexei
- 2003 Law & Order: Special Victims Unit (TV series, 1 episode, "Pandora") as Erich Tassig
- 2003 On Thin Ice (TV movie) as Will
- 2004 24 (TV series, 5 episodes) as Marcus Alvers
- 2004 Gérald L’Écuyer: A Filmmaker’s Journey (TV movie)
- 2004 Third Watch (TV, 1 episode) as Gunman
- 2005 Desolation Sound as Benny
- 2006 Law & Order: Trial by Jury(TV series, 1 episode, "Eros in the Upper Eighties") as Andres Voychek
- 2006 Disappearances as "Carcajou" / William Shakespeare Goodman
- 2007 Walk All Over Me as Rene
- 2007 Race to Mars (TV mini-series, 2 episodes) as Antoine Hebert
- 2007 The Funeral Party
- 2007–2010 The Tudors (TV series) as Ambassador Charles de Marillac
- 2008 Snow Buddies as Francois (voice)
- 2010 The Child Prodigy (L'enfant prodige) as Pipo
- 2012 Missing (TV series, 1 episode) as "Hard Drive"
- 2013 The Storm Within (Rouge sang) as Le Capitaine
- 2014 Law & Order: Special Victims Unit (TV series, 1 episode, "Gambler's Fallacy") as Anton Nadari
- 2015-2016 Vikings (TV, 13 episodes) as Emperor Charles
- 2015 Regression as Reverend Murray
- 2016 Criminal Minds: Beyond Borders (TV, 1 episode) as Commissaire Pierre Clement
- 2022 The Switch (La switch) as Sherif
- 2024 The Thawing of Ice (La fonte des glaces) as Marc St. Germain

== Selected theater credits ==
- The Resistible Rise of Arturo Ui (National Actors Theatre/The Michael Schimmel Center for the Arts at Pace University, New York, 2002), Young Inna/Defendant Fish
- The Cherry Orchard (Mark Taper Forum, Los Angeles, 2006), Gaev

== Awards and recognition ==
Bluteau won the 1990 Genie Award for Best Performance by an Actor in a Leading Role for his work on Jesus of Montreal and was nominated for the same award in 1996 for his work in the film The Confessional (Le Confessionnal). He was nominated for the AFI Award for Best Actor for his work on Black Robe.

Bluteau won the award for Best Actor at the 1997 Gijón International Film Festival for his work on Bent.
