= Charles de Marillac =

French bishop and diplomat

- Born: c.1510 Riom, France
- Died: 2 December 1560; Melun, France

Charles de Marillac (c.1510 – 2 December 1560) was a French prelate and diplomat.

== Career ==
De Marillac was born in Riom and was, by the age of twenty-two, an advocate in parliament in Paris. Suspected, however, of sympathizing with the reformers, he deemed it prudent to leave Paris, and in 1535 went to the East with his cousin Jean de La Forest, the first French ambassador at Constantinople. Cunning and ambitious, he soon made his mark, and his cousin having died during his embassy, Marillac was appointed his successor.

He did not return from the East until 1538, when he was sent almost immediately to England, to replace Louis de Perreau, Sieur de Castillon, at the court of Henry VIII where he remained until 1543. He is known to have sent dispatches back to France detailing events such as the king's first meeting with his fourth wife Anne of Cleves, which resulted in the sudden downfall and demise of the seemingly all-powerful Thomas Cromwell, who was responsible for the ill-fated marriage. Marillac reported in the spring of 1540 that "Cromwell is tottering". While Henry, at first sight, found Anne of Cleves so unattractive that he could not consummate the marriage, Marillac was impressed by her gravity and dignity: though he did not think her a great beauty, in his view she would be a perfectly acceptable Queen of England (she was a distant relative of both the French and English royal families), and he seems to have found Henry's attitude to her rather baffling. He later noted drily that Cromwell was not dead more than a few months before the King was bewailing the loss of his finest minister, and, typically, blaming Cromwell's enemies for persuading him to destroy Cromwell on a trivial pretext. His dispatches are a valuable source of information about the English Court in this tumultuous period, although he was not an entirely reliable source. Marillac himself admitted that the vagaries of English politics were often beyond the understanding of foreigners "so great is the inconstancy of the English".

He retained his influence during the reign of Henry II, fulfilling important missions in Switzerland and later at the imperial court (1547–1551), and at the courts of the German princes (1553–1554). In 1555 he was one of the French deputies at the conferences held at Mark near Ardres to discuss peace with England. His two last missions were at Rome (1557) and at the Diet of Augsburg (1559). In 1550 he was given the bishopric of Vannes, and in 1557 the archbishopric of Vienne; he also became a member of the privy council. He distinguished himself as a statesman at the Assembly of Notables at Fontainebleau in 1560, when he delivered an exceedingly brilliant discourse, in which he opposed the policy of violence and demanded a national council and the assembly of the states-general. Irritated by his opposition, the Guises compelled him to leave the court, and he died on 2 December of the same year, at Melun, France.

== Works ==
Works by Marillac include:

- Discours sur la rupture de la Trève en l'an 1556 (Paris, 1556)
- Sommaire de l'ambassade en Allemagne de feu Mr. l'archevesque de Vienne en l'an 1550, published in Ranke's Deutsche Geschichte im Zeitalter der Reformation, vol. vi. (Leipzig, 1882).
