= Francis of Bourbon =

Francis of Bourbon, François de Bourbon, or Francisco de Borbón may refer to:

- Francis, Count of Vendôme (1470–1495), also 1st duke of Estouteville
- Francis de Bourbon, Count of St. Pol (1491–1545)
- François, Count of Enghien (1519–1546), count of Enghien
- Francis of Bourbon (1536/37–1546), 2nd duke of Estouteville
- François, Duke of Montpensier (1542–1592)
- François de Bourbon, prince de Conti (1558–1614)
- François de Vendôme, Duc de Beaufort (1616–1669)
- François Louis, Prince of Conti (1664–1709)
- Francis of Bourbon (1722–1793), baron of Busset
- Francis I of the Two Sicilies (1777–1830), king
- Francis of Bourbon (1782–1856), baron of Busset
- Prince Francis, Count of Trapani (1827–1892), prince of the Two Sicilies, count of Trapani
- Francis II of the Two Sicilies (1836–1894), king
- Francis of Bourbon (1837–1918), count of Mascali
- Francisco de Paula de Borbón y Castellví (1853–1942)
- Francis of Bourbon (1861–1923), duke of Marchena
- Francis of Bourbon (1873–1876), prince of the Two Sicilies
- Francis of Bourbon (1875–1954), baron of Busset
- Francis of Bourbon (1882–1952), duke of Seville
- Francis of Bourbon (1888–1914), prince of the Two Sicilies
- Francis of Bourbon (1912–1995)
- Francis of Bourbon (1913–1939), prince of Parma
- Francis of Bourbon (1917–2003)
- Francisco de Borbón y Escasany, 5th Duke of Seville (born 1943)
- Francisco de Borbón von Hardenberg (born 1979)
- Francis of Bourbon (born 1960), prince of the Two Sicilies
- Francis of Bourbon (1972–1984), duke of Bourbon
