= Glyndebourne =

English country house in East Sussex, England

Glyndebourne Manor House

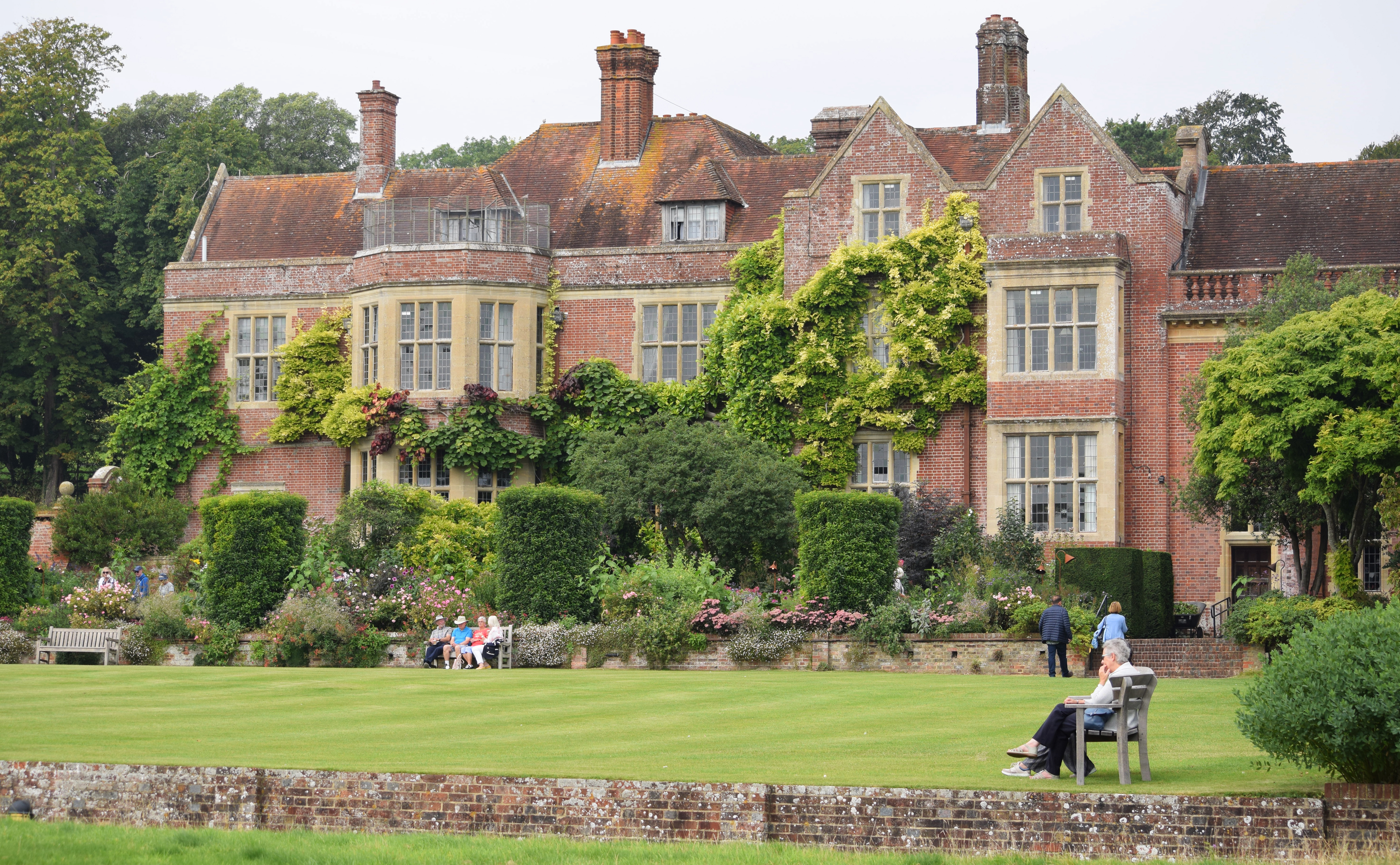
- Glyndebourne manor house in September 2021

- Location within East Sussex

General information
- Type: Manor house
- Location: Near Lewes in East Sussex, England
- Coordinates: 50°52′42″N 0°03′50″E

Glyndebourne (/ˈɡlaɪndbɔːrn/) is an English country house, the site of an opera house that, since 1934, has been the venue for the annual Glyndebourne Festival Opera. The house, near Lewes in East Sussex, is thought to be about six hundred years old and is listed at Grade II.

== History of the house ==
"There had been a manor house at Glynde Bourne (as it was often spelt) since the fifteenth century", but the exact age of the house is unknown. Some surviving timber framing and pre-Elizabethan panelling makes an early 16th-century date the most likely. In 1618, it came into the possession of the Hay family, passing to James Hay Langham in 1824. He inherited his father's baronetcy and estate in Northamptonshire in 1833 which under the terms of his inheritance should have led to him relinquishing Glyndebourne, but as a certified lunatic he was unable to do so. After litigation the estate passed to a relative, Langham Christie, but he later had to pay £50,000 to persuade another relative to withdraw a rival claim.

Langham Christie's son, William Langham Christie, made substantial alterations to the house in the 1870s. First, a brick extension hid its 17th-century façade, while ornate stonework and balustrading was added. Then, in 1876, the architect Ewan Christian was engaged to install bay windows and add decorative brickwork to give the house the Jacobethan appearance which can still be seen from the gardens today. Some of the exterior of the older parts of the house can be seen from the driveway next to the theatre.

== Swiss origins of the Christie family ==
Langham Christie was the son of one Daniel Christin, a Swiss of obscure origins who anglicised his name to Christie on entering the army of the East India Company. According to frequently published accounts, Daniel Christin joined the Bombay Engineers, rising to the rank of major, and the family fortune was made when he was given a hoard of gems by a Sultan in thanks for Christin preventing his troops from pillaging a harem.

Unfortunately, none of these claims finds ready support in the records of the East India Company or indeed in any accounts of the period. The rank of major seems to have been a later invention. There was indeed a Major Christie of the Madras Engineers, however he was shot dead by a Cossack near the river Aras in 1812, some three years after Daniel Christie had died. In his will, Daniel Christie refers to himself as formerly a captain in the service of the English East India Company under the presidency of Bombay, there being no mention of higher rank or of an engineering connection. The Christie family pedigree cites Daniel Christie's dates of promotion, first to Lieutenant in 1781 and to Captain in 1783, but no records to support these claims have been offered or traced thus far.

The only Daniel Christie to be found for this period in East India Company records is a surgeon's mate of the Sixth Regiment of Bombay Native Infantry. The Christie family pedigree claims that in 1782 Christin served in the war against Hyder Ali in Mysore. That Hyder Ali died in that year and that there was extensive looting by East India Company soldiers from Ali's palace, as was commonplace throughout the Anglo-Mysore Wars, is perhaps suggestive.

Whatever the truth regarding his origins, rank or source of sudden wealth, Daniel Christie undoubtedly returned to England with a fortune estimated at £20,000 (equivalent to about £35 million in 2021 values), and his second marriage to Elizabeth, daughter of Sir Purbeck Langham, ultimately brought Glyndebourne into the Christin/Christie family.

== Origins of the opera house ==
John Christie obtained the use of the house in 1913 after the death of William Langham Christie, his grandfather. He came into full legal possession of the estate in 1920. Among other renovations, he added to the house an organ room, 80 feet (24 m) long, in the process almost doubling the length of the south façade of the house. This room contained one of the largest organs outside of a cathedral in the country; it was built by the firm of Hill, Norman & Beard Ltd (bought by Christie in 1923). After the Second World War, John Christie made a gift of sections of the soundboards, pipes and structural parts to the rebuilt Guards Chapel, Wellington Barracks (which had been destroyed in the Blitz); the case and console remain at Glyndebourne.

John Christie's fondness for music led him to hold regular amateur opera evenings in this room. At one of these evenings in 1931, he met his future wife, the Sussex-born Canadian soprano Audrey Mildmay, a singer with the Carl Rosa Opera company who had been engaged to add a touch of professionalism to the proceedings. They were married on 4 June 1931. During their honeymoon, they attended the Salzburg and Bayreuth festivals, which gave them the idea of bringing professional opera to Glyndebourne, although Christie's original concept was for it to be similar to the Bayreuth Festival. As their ideas evolved, the concept changed towards smaller-scale productions of operas by Mozart, more suited to the intimate scale of the planned theatre.

== The first theatre ==
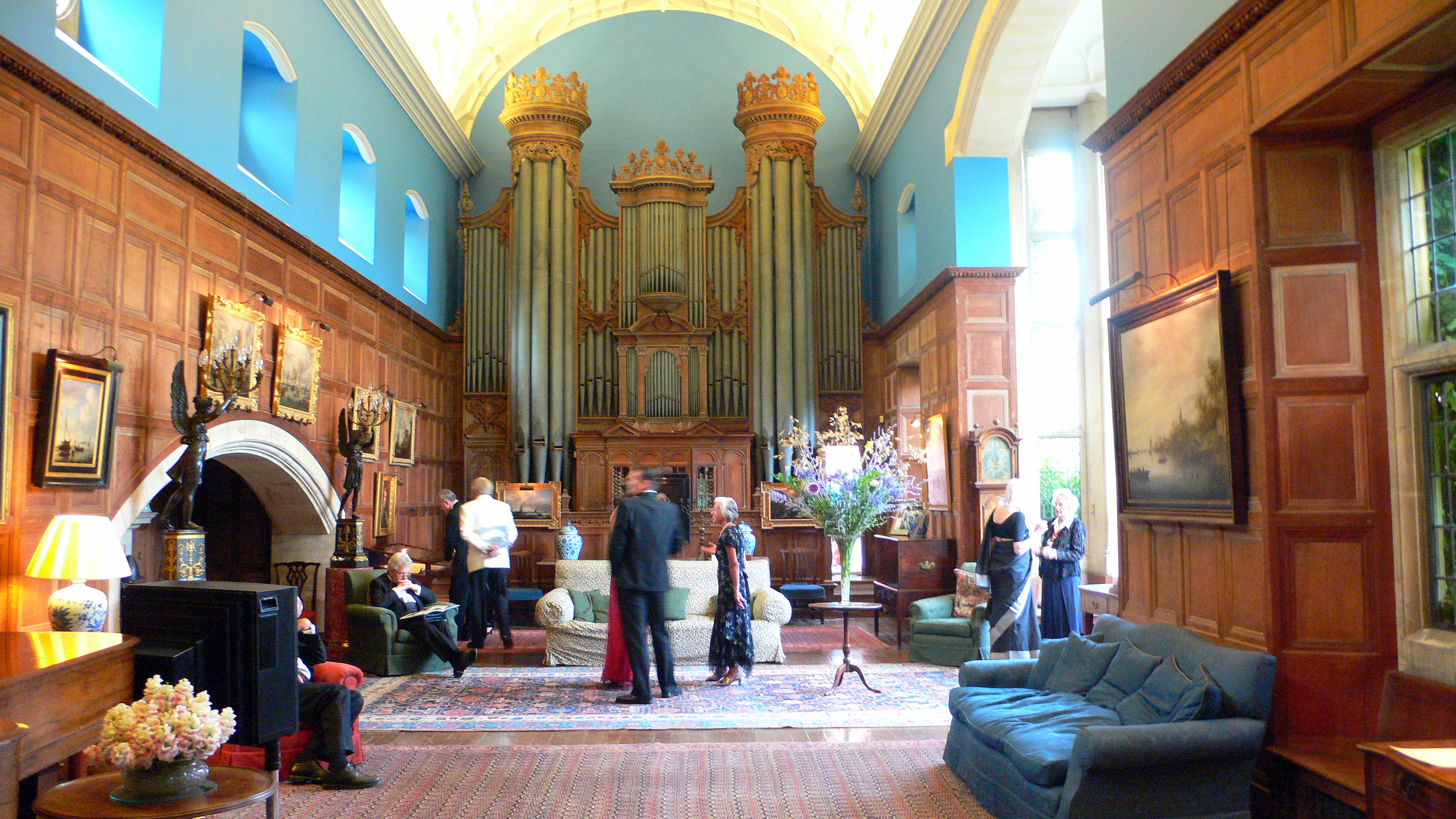
The organ room in 2006

As an annex to the organ room, the Christies built a fully equipped and up-to-date theatre with a 300-seat auditorium and an orchestra pit capable of holding a symphony orchestra. Christie engaged conductor Fritz Busch as the first music director and Carl Ebert, the Intendant of Berlin's Städtische Oper, as artistic director. Rudolf Bing became general manager and held that role until 1949. All three men were exiles from Nazi Germany.

After extensive rehearsals, the first six-week season opened on 28 May 1934 with a performance of Le nozze di Figaro followed by Così fan tutte. Boyd Neel had conducted the first music heard in the renovated Glyndebourne opera house in 1934, in private performances, at Christie's invitation.

John Christie's original theatre was soon enlarged and improved many times after its initial construction. As early as 1936 its capacity was increased to 433; by 1952 it held nearly 600, and finally, in 1977, it held 850 people. In addition, a rehearsal hall was constructed.

Productions were interrupted by the Second World War, during which time the house became an evacuation centre for children from London. After 1945 the festival slowly began again. Until 1951, the entire burden of financing the opera festival was undertaken by John Christie himself, but, in 1952, the Glyndebourne Festival Society was formed to take over the financial management. Christie's death in 1962 resulted in his son George (later Sir George) taking over, and changes and improvements to the theatre continued.

Hill, Norman and Beard built the pipe organ in 1924, and it gradually expanded over the years. John Christie owned a considerable share in the company. Currently, the organ is a gutted shell, the pipes having been donated to various churches for the construction of new organs after World War II. The organ originally contained four manuals and 46 stops, but was eventually expanded to 106 stops, unusual for an English-built organ in having multiple diapason chorus ranks of pipes.

A short semi-documentary film was made in 1955 titled On Such a Night, featuring excerpts from that year's production of Le nozze di Figaro and with glimpses of John Christie, Vittorio Gui and Carl Ebert, interwoven with a fictional story about an American going there for the first time.

== The present theatre ==
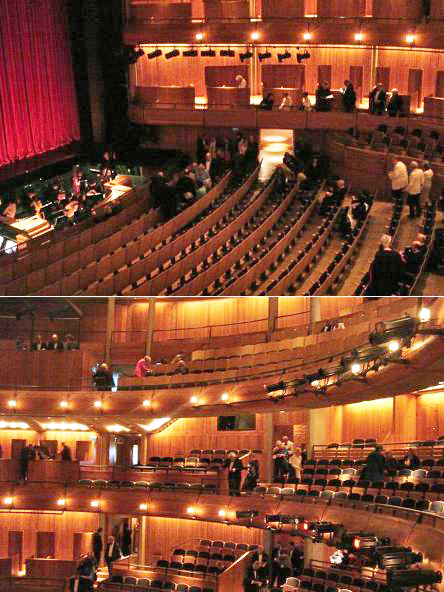
Interior of the present Glyndebourne Opera House, 2008

By the late 1980s the theatre's expansion, which had proceeded in a somewhat piecemeal fashion, included an agglomeration of outbuildings which housed restaurants, dressing rooms, storage and other facilities. It became clear to George Christie that a completely new theatre – and not just an enlargement of the old one – was necessary. Having chosen the architects Michael and Patty Hopkins of Hopkins Architects in a design competition, Christie announced in 1990 that a new theatre, capable of seating 1,200 people, would be constructed in 1992.

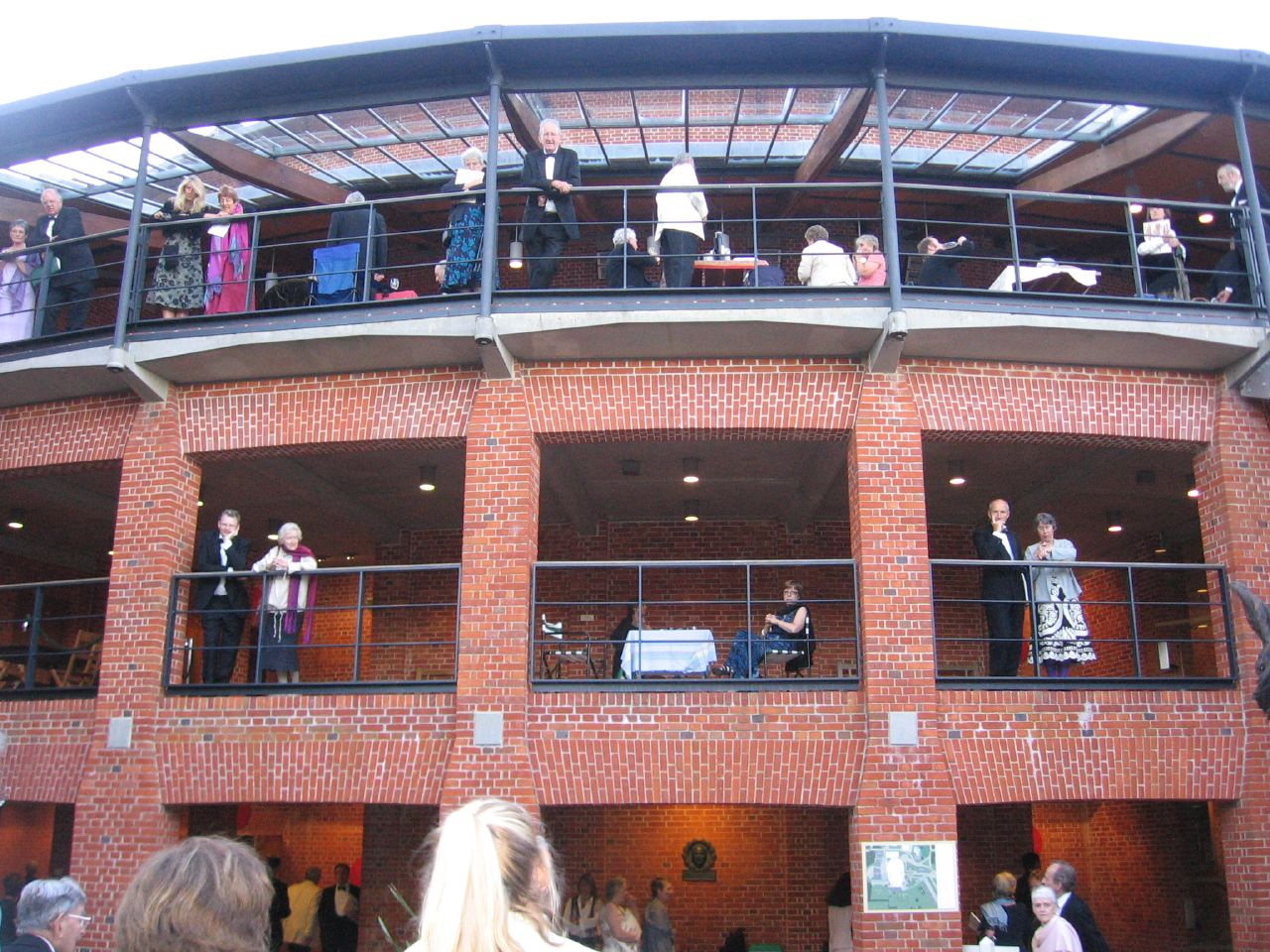
The balcony of the present theatre

The old theatre hosted its last festival in 1992, and construction of a brand-new theatre began. It was completed at a cost of £34 million, 90 per cent of which was raised through donations, which gave the donors control of 28% of the seats. The inaugural performance in the new theatre on 28 May 1994, given 60 years to the day after the old theatre's first performance, was Le nozze di Figaro.

The design of the theatre, a large brick oval building, has resulted in a four-level, horseshoe-shaped auditorium with main level seating, two balconies, and a gallery topped with a circular roof. The over 60-foot (18 m) high stage building is semicircular in shape and allows for the efficient flying and storage of scenery. The acoustics, by Derek Sugden and Rob Harris of Arup Acoustics, have received praise.

== Education ==
Since its establishment in 1986, Glyndebourne's education department has undertaken an array of projects within the local community. Schools around the Sussex and Kent area often visit the venue for performances and workshops. Youth opera projects are also undertaken, such as a production of Knight Crew for 14- to 19-year-olds, and the earlier Hip H'Opera project in 2006 – timed to coincide with the 250th anniversary of Mozart's birth. The department has also worked with HM Prison Lewes since 1988, on projects such as inmate-designed puppet shows influenced by works such as Verdi's Falstaff.

== Wind turbine ==
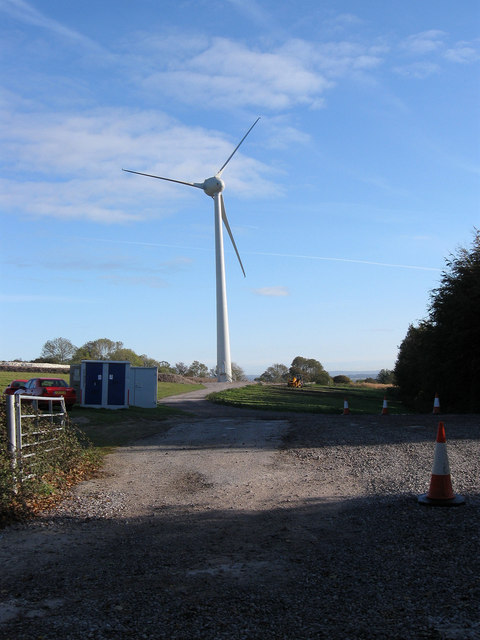
The Glyndebourne wind turbine, viewed from the rear

Glyndebourne has featured windmills for many years. A post-mill, erected in 1706, was used until 1921, but collapsed in 1925, and the trestle timbers were blown down in 1964.

Glyndebourne applied for planning permission to Lewes District Council for a wind turbine in January 2007. The council granted permission in July 2007, but the decision was called in by the Secretary of State because of the wider implications of the proposal for renewable energy development in the South Downs Area of Outstanding Natural Beauty, and strong opposition from countryside protection groups and local residents. On 10 July 2008, the Secretary of State granted planning permission.

In 2008–9, Glyndebourne erected a temporary 50 m (160 ft) mast on Mill Plain to monitor meteorological conditions for a year, prior to erection of the turbine. The data collected showed lower wind levels than had been predicted at this location, perhaps because 2008–9 had lower wind levels than usual. The turbine was launched in January 2012. In its first five years the turbine generated the equivalent of 102% of Glyndebourne's annual electricity requirements, outperforming its annual target of 90%.
