= Tom Stoppard Theatre =

West End theatre in London

- Duke of York's Theatre; Trafalgar Theatre; The Trafalgar; Royal Court Downstairs (during redevelopment at Sloane Square)
- Tom Stoppard Theatre in 2026
- Interactive map of Tom Stoppard Theatre
- Address: St Martin's Lane; London, WC2; United Kingdom
- Coordinates: 51.51°N 0.1275°W
- Owner: ATG Entertainment
- Capacity: 640 on 3 levels (900 on 4 levels in 1892)
- Type: West End Theatre
- Designation: Grade II listed
- Production: Rent
- Public transit: Charing Cross; Leicester Square; Charing Cross

Construction
- Opened: 10 September 1892; 134 years ago
- Architect: Walter Emden

Website
- www.tomstoppardtheatre.com

The Tom Stoppard Theatre (formerly Duke of York's Theatre) is a West End theatre in St Martin's Lane, in the City of Westminster, London.

== History ==
It was built for Frank Wyatt and his wife, Violet Melnotte, who retained ownership of the theatre until her death in 1935. Designed by the architect Walter Emden, it opened on 10 September 1892 as the Trafalgar Square Theatre, and was renamed Trafalgar Theatre in 1894. The following year, it became the Duke of York's to honour the future King George V.

The theatre's opening show was comic opera The Wedding Eve by Frédéric Toulmouche. One of the earliest musical comedies, Go-Bang, was a success at the theatre in 1894. In 1900, Jerome K. Jerome's Miss Hobbs was staged as well as David Belasco's Madame Butterfly, which was seen by Puccini, who later turned it into the famous opera. This was also the theatre where J. M. Barrie's Peter Pan, or The Boy Who Wouldn't Grow Up debuted on 27 December 1904. Many famous British actors have appeared here, including Basil Rathbone, who played Alfred de Musset in Madame Sand in June 1920, returning in November 1932 as the Unknown Gentleman in Tonight or Never.

The theatre was Grade II listed by English Heritage in September 1960. In the late 1970s the freehold of the theatre was purchased by Capital Radio and it closed in 1979 for refurbishment. It reopened in February 1980 and the first production under the patronage of Capital was Rose, starring Glenda Jackson. In 1991 comedian Pat Condell performed sketches at the theatre which were later released on DVD.

ATG Entertainment bought the theatre in 1992; this coincided with the successful Royal Court production of Ariel Dorfman's Death and the Maiden. A host of successes followed including the 21st anniversary performance of Richard O'Brien's The Rocky Horror Show and the Royal Court Classics Season in 1995.

The theatre houses the producing offices of ATG Entertainment's subsidiary Sonia Friedman Productions, whose revival of In Celebration starring Orlando Bloom played until 15 September 2007.

Singers Rag'n'Bone Man and Pink filmed their 2021 video for Anywhere Away From Here in the theatre.

In July 2026, the theatre announced its renaming after British playwright Tom Stoppard.

== Recent, current and future productions ==
- After Mrs Rochester (22 July 2003 – 25 October 2003) by Polly Teale
- Sweet Panic (12 November 2004 – 7 February 2004) by Stephen Poliakoff
- Calico (3 March 2004 – 3 April 2004) by Michael Hastings
- The Holy Terror (14 April 2004 – 8 May 2004) by Simon Gray
- Dirty Blonde (16 June 2004 – 28 August 2004) by Claudia Shear
- Journey's End (5 October 2004 – 19 February 2005) by R. C. Sherriff
- The Dresser (28 February 2005 – 14 May 2005) by Ronald Harwood, starring Nicholas Lyndhurst and Julian Glover
- Hedda Gabler (27 May 2005 – 6 August 2005) by Henrik Ibsen, starring Eve Best and Iain Glen
- Tom, Dick and Harry (23 August 2005 – 29 October 2005) by Ray Cooney and Michael Cooney, starring Joe, Stephen and Mark McGann
- I Am My Own Wife (10 November 2005 – 10 December 2005) by Doug Wright, starring Jefferson Mays
- Embers (1 March 2006 – 24 June 2006) by Sándor Márai, adapted by Christopher Hampton, starring Jeremy Irons and Patrick Malahide
- Eh Joe (27 June 2006 – 15 July 2006) by Samuel Beckett, starring Michael Gambon
- Rock 'n' Roll (22 July 2006 – 24 February 2007) by Tom Stoppard, starring David Calder, Emma Fielding, Dominic West, Rufus Sewell, and Nicola Bryant
- Little Shop of Horrors (12 March 2007 – 23 June 2007) by Alan Menken, starring Sheridan Smith, Paul Keating and Alistair McGowan
- In Celebration (5 July 2007 – 15 September 2007) by David Storey, starring Orlando Bloom, Tim Healy and Lynda Baron
- Rent Remixed (16 October 2007 – 2 February 2008), by Jonathan Larson, starring Denise Van Outen (succeeded on 24 December 2007 by Jessie Wallace)
- The Magic Flute (8 February 2008 – 12 April 2008)
- That Face (1 May 2008 – 5 July 2008) by Polly Stenham, starring Lindsay Duncan, Hannah Murray and Matt Smith
- Under the Blue Sky (25 July 2008 – 20 September 2008) by David Eldridge, starring Catherine Tate, Francesca Annis and Dominic Rowan
- No Man's Land (7 October 2008 – 3 January 2009) by Harold Pinter, starring Michael Gambon, David Bradley, David Walliams and Nick Dunning
- A View From the Bridge (5 February 2009 – 16 May 2009) by Arthur Miller, starring Ken Stott
- Arcadia (27 May 2009 – 12 September 2009) by Tom Stoppard starring Samantha Bond, Nancy Carroll, Jessie Cave, Trevor Cooper, Sam Cox, Lucy Griffiths, Tom Hodgkins, Hugh Mitchell, Neil Pearson, George Potts, Dan Stevens and Ed Stoppard
- Speaking in Tongues (18 September 2009 – 12 December 2009) by Andrew Bovell starring John Simm
- Bedroom Farce (24 March 2010 – 10 July 2010) by Alan Ayckbourn
- Ghost Stories (25 June 2010 – 16 July 2011) by Jeremy Dyson and Andy Nyman starring Andy Nyman, David Cardy, Ryan Gage and Nicholas Burns
- Journey's End (19 July 2011 – 3 September 2011) by R. C. Sherriff
- Backbeat (10 October 2011 – 18 February 2012), co-written by Iain Softley and Stephen Jeffreys, musical direction by Paul Stacey, and directed by David Leveaux.
- All New People (22 February 2012 – 28 April 2012) by Zach Braff, directed by Peter DuBois, starring Zach Braff, Eve Myles, Paul Hilton and Susannah Fielding.
- Posh (23 May 2012 – 4 August 2012) (transfers from the Royal Court Theatre)
- Jumpy (28 August 2012 – 3 November 2012) by April de Angelis, starring Tamsin Greig
- Constellations (16 November 2012 – 5 January 2013) by Nick Payne, starring Sally Hawkins and Rafe Spall (transfers from the Royal Court Theatre)
- The Judas Kiss (17 January 2013 – 6 April 2013) by David Hare, starring Rupert Everett and Freddie Fox (transfers from the Hampstead Theatre)
- Passion Play (7 May 2013 – 3 August 2013) by Peter Nichols, starring Zoë Wanamaker
- A Doll's House (14 August 2013 – 26 October 2013) by Henrik Ibsen, starring Hattie Morahan
- Jeeves and Wooster in Perfect Nonsense (12 November 2013 – 20 September 2014) by P. G. Wodehouse
- Neville's Island (10 October 2014 – 3 January 2015) by Tim Firth, starring Adrian Edmondson, Miles Jupp, Neil Morrissey and Robert Webb
- The Nether (30 January 2015 – 25 April 2015) by Jennifer Haley (transfer from the Royal Court Theatre)
- Hay Fever (11 May 2015 – 1 August 2015) by Noël Coward, starring Felicity Kendal
- Hetty Feather (6 August 2015 – 6 September 2015) by Jacqueline Wilson
- Farinelli and the King (29 September 2015 – 5 December 2015) by Claire van Kampen, starring Mark Rylance (transfer from the Sam Wanamaker Playhouse)
- Goodnight Mister Tom (17 December 2015 – 20 February 2016), starring David Troughton
- The Father (1 March 2016 – 26 March 2016), starring Kenneth Cranham
- Doctor Faustus (9 April 2016 – 25 June 2016), starring Kit Harington
- How the Other Half Loves (7 July 2016 – 1 October 2016) by Alan Ayckbourn
- The Dresser (12 October 2016 – 14 January 2017) by Ronald Harwood, starring Ken Stott and Reece Shearsmith
- The Glass Menagerie (2 February 2017 – 29 April 2017) by Tennessee Williams, starring Cherry Jones
- Our Ladies of Perpetual Succour (15 May 2017 – 2 September 2017)
- Ink (19 September 2017 – 6 January 2018) by James Graham, starring Bertie Carvel and Richard Coyle
- Mary Stuart (25 January 2018 – 31 March 2018) by Friedrich Schiller, in a new version by Robert Icke, starring Juliet Stevenson and Lia Williams
- The Moderate Soprano (12 April 2018 – 30 June 2018) by David Hare, starring Roger Allam and Nancy Carroll
- King Lear (26 July 2018 – 3 November 2018) by William Shakespeare, starring Ian McKellen
- Summer and Smoke (20 November 2018 – 19 January 2019) by Tennessee Williams, starring Patsy Ferran and Matthew Needham
- Home, I’m Darling (5 February 2019 – 13 April 2019) by Laura Wade, starring Katherine Parkinson
- Rosmersholm (2 May 2019 – 20 July 2019) by Henrik Ibsen, starring Hayley Atwell and Tom Burke
- The Girl on the Train (23 July 2019 – 17 August 2019)
- The Son (2 September 2019 – 2 November 2019) by Florian Zeller, translated by Christopher Hampton
- Touching the Void (9 November 2019 - 29 February 2020) by David Greig
- Blithe Spirit (10 March 2020 – 11 April 2020) by Noël Coward, starring Jennifer Saunders (production closed early due to COVID-19 pandemic)
- The Ocean at the End of the Lane (23 October 2021 – 14 May 2022)
- The Glass Menagerie (23 May 2022 – 27 August 2022) by Tennessee Williams, starring Amy Adams
- A Different Stage (30 August 2022 - 25 September 2022) created and performed by Gary Barlow
- The Doctor (4 October 2022 – 11 December 2022) by Robert Icke, starring Juliet Stevenson
- Mother Goose (15 December 2022 – 29 January 2023) starring Ian McKellen and John Bishop
- Shirley Valentine (17 February 2023 – 3 June 2023) by Willy Russell, starring Sheridan Smith
- The Pillowman (10 June 2023 – 2 September 2023) by Martin McDonagh, starring Lily Allen and Steve Pemberton
- Vanya (15 September 2023 – 21 October 2023) in a new version by Simon Stephens, starring Andrew Scott
- An Enemy of the People (6 February 2024 – 6 April 2024) by Henrik Ibsen, in a new version written and directed by Thomas Ostermeier, starring Matt Smith
- Shifters (12 August 2024 - 12 October 2024) by Benedict Lombe
- Barcelona (21 October 2024 - 11 January 2025) by Bess Wohl starring Lily Collins and Álvaro Morte
- Elektra (24 January 2025 - 12 April 2025) by Sophocles, translated by Anne Carson, starring Brie Larson
- Stereophonic (9 June 2025 - 22 November 2025) by David Adjmi, original songs by Will Butler, directed by Daniel Aukin
- Woman in Mind (9 December 2025 - 28 February 2026) by Alan Ayckbourn, starring Sheridan Smith
- Teeth 'n' Smiles (13 March 2026 - 6 June 2026) by David Hare, starring Rebecca Lucy Taylor and Phil Daniels
- Arcadia (20 June 2026 – 12 September 2026) by Tom Stoppard
- Rent (26 September 2026 – TBC) by Jonathan Larson

=== Michael Grandage Company ===
- Backstairs Billy (27 October 2023 – 27 January 2024) by Marcelo Dos Santos, starring Penelope Wilton and Luke Evans

=== Jamie Lloyd Company ===
- Romeo and Juliet (11 May 2024 – 3 August 2024) by William Shakespeare, starring Tom Holland

== Nearby Underground Stations ==
- Charing Cross
- Leicester Square
- Embankment
