= The Moderate Soprano =

Play written by David Hare

The Moderate Soprano is a 2015 play by the British playwright David Hare. It is a historical play dealing with John Christie, his founding of Glyndebourne Opera and his romance and marriage with Audrey Mildmay, the eponymous soprano.

The premiere production was directed by Jeremy Herrin at the Hampstead Theatre from 23 October to 28 November 2015. That production transferred to the Duke of York's Theatre in central London from 5 April to 30 June 2018, with Allam and Carroll reprising the lead roles.

== Premiere cast ==
- Roger Allam – John Christie
- Nancy Carroll – Audrey Mildmay
- Paul Jesson – Fritz Busch
- Nick Sampson – Carl Ebert
- George Taylor – Rudolf Bing
