= Nancy Carroll =

Nancy Caroll may refer to:

- Nancy Carroll (American actress) (1903–1965)
- Nancy Carroll (British actress) (born 1973)

== See also ==
- Nancy Carell (born 1966), American actress, comedian, and writer
