= Mary Christie =

Mary Christie may refer to:

- Mary Bonham-Christie (1865–1961), English owner of Brownsea Island
- Mary Christie, Lady Christie (1937–2020), British arts administrator
- Mary Pat Christie (born 1963), American investment banker and politician
