= M. L. Longworth =

Canadian author

Mary Lou Longworth (1967), known as M. L. Longworth, is a Canadian author best known for her Verlaque and Bonnet series of detective novels set in Aix-en-Provence.

In 2021, it was announced that BritBox planned to adapt Longworth’s novels into a series titled Murder In Provence. The series debuted in March 2022, starring Roger Allam in the lead role of Antoine Verlaque and Nancy Carroll as his romantic partner Marine Bonnet.

Longworth was born in Toronto and moved to Aix in 1997. She has been influenced by Barbara Pym, and her mysteries are like "intricate puzzles". Longworth also teaches writing at NYU Paris.

== Bibliography ==
- Death at the Chateau Bremont (A Verlaque & Bonnet Provençal Mystery Book 1), Penguin USA (2011)
- Murder in the Rue Dumas (A Verlaque & Bonnet Provençal Mystery Book 2), Penguin USA (2012)
- Death in the Vines (A Verlaque & Bonnet Provençal Mystery Book 3), Penguin USA (2013)
- Murder on the Île Sordou (A Verlaque and Bonnet Provençal Mystery Book 4), Penguin USA (2014)
- The Mystery of the Lost Cezanne (A Verlaque & Bonnet Provençal Mystery Book 5), Penguin USA (2015)
- The Curse of La Fontaine (A Provençal Mystery Book 6), Penguin USA (2017)
- The Secrets of the Bastide Blanche (A Provençal Mystery Book 7), Penguin USA (2018)
- A Noël Killing (A Provençal Mystery Book 8), Penguin USA (2019)
- The Vanishing Museum on the Rue Mistral (A Provençal Mystery Book 9), Penguin USA (2021)
- Disaster at the Vendome Theater (A Provençal Mystery Book 10), Penguin USA (Release date: October 4, 2022)
