= Roger Allam =

English actor (born 1953)

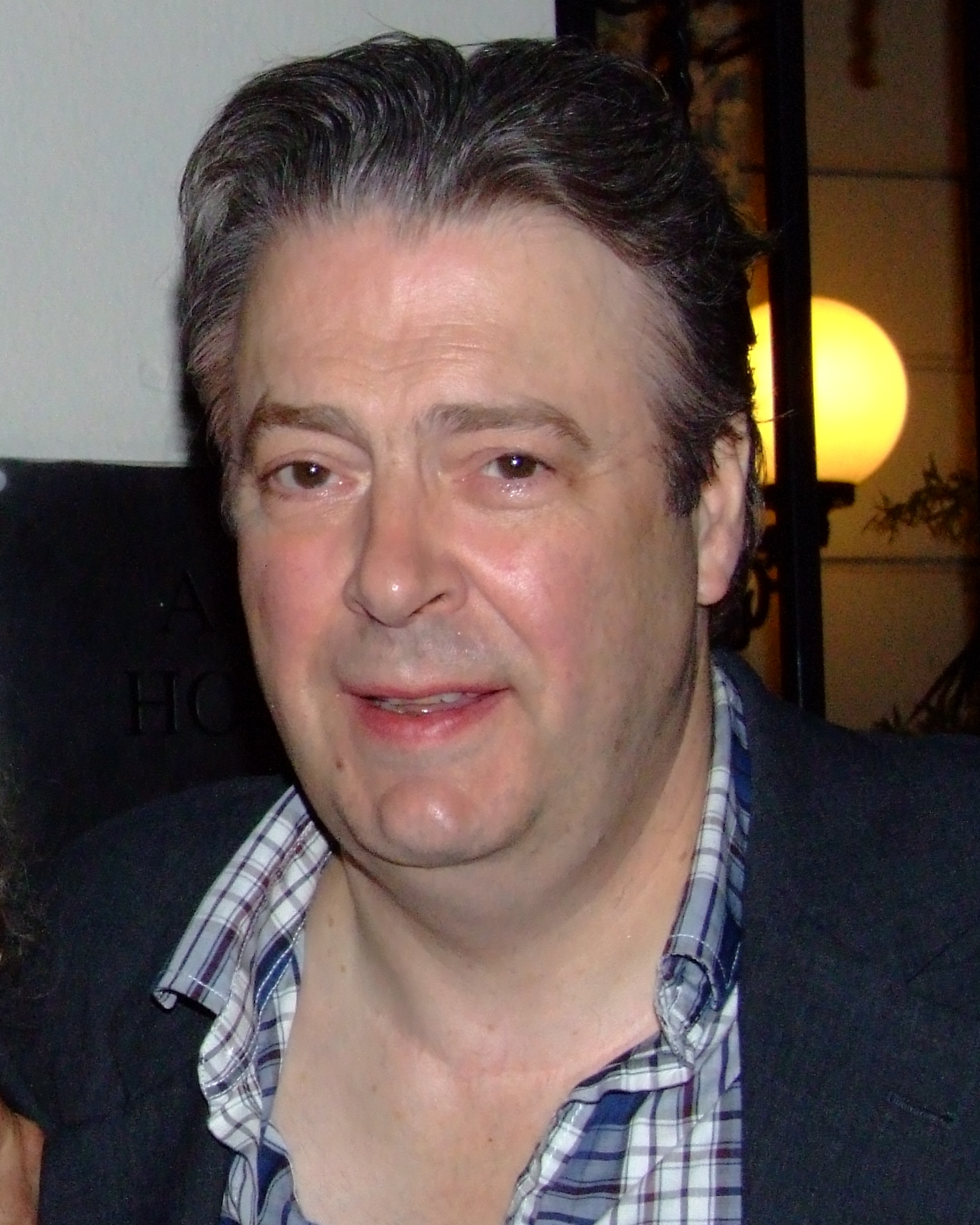
- Allam in 2009
- Born: Roger William Allam; 26 October 1953 (age 73); Bow, London, England
- Occupation: Actor
- Years active: 1976–present
- Spouse: Rebecca Saire
- Children: 2
- Website: all-allam.com

Roger William Allam (born 26 October 1953) is an English actor. Known for his work on stage and screen, he has received three Laurence Olivier Awards.

He played Inspector Javert in the original London production of the stage musical Les Misérables, First Officer Douglas Richardson in the award-winning radio series Cabin Pressure, and DCI Fred Thursday in the TV series Endeavour. He is also known for his roles as Illyrio Mopatis in the HBO series Game of Thrones, Royalton in Speed Racer, Lewis Prothero in the 2005 adaptation of V for Vendetta and as Peter Mannion MP in The Thick of It.

== Life and career ==
=== Early years and education ===
Allam was born in Bow, London, England. His father was rector of St Mary Woolnoth. In 1959, his family left Bromley-by-Bow, moving to Putney, later moving to Muswell Hill, due to his father's commitments. He was educated at Christ's Hospital and Manchester University.

=== Acting career ===
He played Mercutio for the Royal Shakespeare Company in their 1983 production of Romeo and Juliet.

From 1985 to 1986, he played Inspector Javert in the original London production of the stage musical Les Misérables.

He has also appeared in many radio dramas for the BBC. In 2001, he starred in BBC Radio 4's adaptation of Les Misérables as Jean Valjean. In 2000 he played Adolf Hitler at the Royal National Theatre in David Edgar's Albert Speer. He won an Olivier Award as Best Actor 2001, for his role as Captain Terri Denis in a revival of Privates on Parade, opening in December 2001 at the Donmar Warehouse, Covent Garden. In November 2002 at the Comedy Theatre he co-starred with Gillian Anderson in Michael Weller's romantic comedy What the Night Is For.

In 2003, he appeared as former West German federal chancellor Willy Brandt in Michael Frayn's play Democracy which opened at the Cottesloe Theatre, in the Royal National Theatre. He stayed with the show for its transfer to the West End. In December 2004 and January 2005, Allam appeared as the villainous Abanazar in a pantomime of Aladdin at the Old Vic theatre, co-starring Ian McKellen, Maureen Lipman and Sam Kelly. He reprised this role at the Old Vic, once again with Ian McKellen and Frances Barber in 2006–07. In August 2005, Allam appeared in Blackbird by David Harrower alongside Jodhi May at the Edinburgh Festival in a production by German star director Peter Stein. The play transferred to the Albery Theatre in London in February 2006. Blackbird subsequently won a best new play award.

In 2006 he appeared in Stephen Frears's film The Queen, starring Oscar-winner Dame Helen Mirren, as the Queen's private secretary. In February 2007, he performed in the 1960s farce Boeing-Boeing at the Comedy Theatre in the West End, co-starring Mark Rylance, Frances de la Tour and Tamzin Outhwaite. In 2007, he appeared for the first time as Peter Mannion MP in the special episodes of the BBC comedy The Thick of It. He reprised the role in the third series (2009), and returned in the final series (2012) as part of the expanded regular cast.

In 2008, Allam played the role of Max Reinhardt, the Salzburg Festival impresario in Michael Frayn's play Afterlife, the production staged by Michael Blakemore on the National Theatre's Lyttelton stage. In 2009, Allam played Albin/Zaza in La Cage aux Folles at the Playhouse in London. Allam played Falstaff in Henry IV, Part 1 and Henry IV, Part 2 at Shakespeare's Globe, in the 2010 season. He won the Olivier Award for Best Actor. In October 2010, Allam was reunited with his former cast mates from Les Misérables in the 25th anniversary concert for a performance of "One Day More".

In January 2012, he starred in the first series of Endeavour, the prequel to the long-running Inspector Morse, playing the gruff but kind-hearted Detective Inspector Fred Thursday, young Endeavour Morse's mentor in 1960s Oxford. By 2018 Allam had portrayed his central character in five additional well-received series, which are also aired in America as part of the PBS Masterpiece Mystery! series. In March 2019, the show's sixth season had concluded on ITV, was scheduled for broadcast in the summer in the United States, and had been recommissioned for a seventh season to be set in 1970.

In April 2012 he also starred as Vanya in the play Uncle Vanya by Anton Chekhov at the Chichester Festival Theatre; in 2020 he returned to the play in the role of Serebrayakov in a filmed version of a production, replacing Ciaran Hinds from the stage version. In 2013 he played the role of Prospero in William Shakespeare's play The Tempest at Shakespeare's Globe theatre in London alongside Colin Morgan as Ariel and Academy-Award winner Jessie Buckley as Miranda. Allam presented Michael Frayn at the 2013 Olivier Awards with a Special Lifetime Award which was aired by ITV1. Allam has also reteamed with Stephen Frears in Tamara Drewe, the film version of Posy Simmonds's popular comic strip. He plays the crime novelist Nicholas Hardiment, who is bewitched by London journalist Tamara Drewe, played by Gemma Arterton. In the closing chapter of his Timebends autobiography (1987) Arthur Miller writes of Allam: "To play Adrian....in the 1986 Royal Shakespeare Company production of The Archbishop's Ceiling, Roger Allam gave up the leading role as Javert in the monster hit Les Misérables because he had done it over sixty times and thought my play more challenging for him at that moment of his career. Nor did he consider his decision a particularly courageous one. This is part of what a theatre culture means and it is something few New York actors would have the sense of security even to dream of doing."

Allam narrated the Channel 4 series The Auction House.

In October and November 2016 Allam appeared as Brigadier Adrian Stone in the BBC series The Missing.

Since January 2020, Allam has co-starred with Joanna Lumley in the BBC Radio 4 comedy drama series Conversations from a Long Marriage. As of May 2025, the show is in its sixth series.

In March 2022, Allam debuted in the lead role of Antoine Verlaque in Murder in Provence, a BritBox cosy crime drama based on the Verlaque & Bonnet detective novels by ML Longworth, alongside Nancy Carroll as his romantic partner Marine Bonnet.

Allam voices the demon Azazel in the 2022 Netflix adaptation of Neil Gaiman's The Sandman.

In 2026 Alam co-starred as Sir Alan Brabazon, the Chief of MI6, in the espionage thriller Secret Service, a television serialisation in 5 episodes of a novel of the same name by Tom Bradby. The series premiered on 27 April 2026 on ITV1 and ITVX.

== Personal life ==
Allam is married to actress Rebecca Saire, with whom he has two sons, William, an actor, and Thomas. Rebecca and William appeared together as mother and son in the Endeavour episode Raga (series 7, episode 2, broadcast February 2020).

Allam identifies as politically left, and has publicly castigated Donald Trump.

== Acting credits ==
=== Film ===
Year	Title	Role	Notes
1989	Wilt	Dave	
2002	Stranded	Thomas Blunt	
2005	A Cock and Bull Story	Adrian	
2006	V for Vendetta	Lewis Prothero	
2006	The Wind That Shakes the Barley	Sir John Hamilton	
2006	The Queen	Robin Janvrin	
2008	Speed Racer	E.P. Arnold Royalton	
2008	Inkheart	Narrator	Voice
2010	Tamara Drewe	Nicholas Hardiment	
2011	Pirates of the Caribbean: On Stranger Tides	Henry Pelham	
2011	The Iron Lady	Gordon Reece	
2012	The Woman in Black	Mr. Bentley	
2012	The Angels' Share	Thaddeus	
2013	The Book Thief	Narrator/Death	Voice
2015	Mr. Holmes	Dr. Barrie	
2015	A Royal Night Out	Stan	
2015	The Lady in the Van	Rufus	
2016	The Truth Commissioner	Henry Stanfield	
2017	The Hippopotamus	Ted Wallace	
2020	Say Your Prayers	Professor Huxley	
2023	Tetris	Robert Maxwell	
2025	The Choral	Bernard Duxbury	
2025	Steve	Sir Hugh Montague Powell	
2026	Frank and Percy †	Frank	Post-production

=== Television ===
Year	Title	Role	Notes
1989	Ending Up	Dr. Mainwaring	TV film
1989	The Fairy Queen	Oberon	TV film
1990	The Investigation: Inside a Terrorist Bombing	Charles Tremayne	TV film
1992	Shakespeare: The Animated Tales	Duke Orsino/Narrator	Voice; TV mini-series Episodes: "The Winter's Tale" & "Twelfth Night"
1994	Screen Two	Stephen Summerchild	TV series Episode: "A Landing on the Sun"
1997	Inspector Morse	Denis Cornford	TV series Episode: "Death Is Now My Neighbour"
1997	The Bill	Ralph Marchbank	TV series Episode: "Hitting the Nerve"
1998	Heartbeat	Graham Hayes	TV series Episode: "Echoes of the Past"
1998	Midsomer Murders	Alan Hollingsworth	TV series Episode: "Faithful unto Death"
1998–2000	The Creatives	Charlie Baxter	TV series
1999	RKO 281	Walt Disney	TV film
2002	Foyle's War	Alastair Graeme	TV series Episode: "Eagle Day"
2002	Waking the Dead	Benjamin Gold	TV series Episode: "Thin Air"
2003	The Roman Spring of Mrs. Stone	Christopher	TV film
2005	The Inspector Lynley Mysteries	Simon Featherstonehaugh	TV series Episode: "The Seed of Cunning"
2005–present	Muffin the Mule	Narrator	Audiobooks only
2006	Spooks	Paul Millington	TV series
2007–2012	The Thick of It	Peter Mannion	TV series
2008	The Curse of Steptoe	Tom Sloane	TV film
2009	The Old Guys	Ned	TV series Episode: "The Therapist"
2009	Margaret	John Wakeham	TV film
2009	Kröd Mändoon and the Flaming Sword of Fire	General Arcadius	TV series
2009	Ashes to Ashes	DSI Mackintosh	TV series
2011	Game of Thrones	Magister Illyrio Mopatis	TV series; Episodes: "Winter is Coming" & "The Wolf and the Lion"
2011	The Jury	John Mallory, QC	TV serial; Series 2
2012	Parade's End	General Campion	TV series
2012–2023	Endeavour	DI Fred Thursday	TV series
2013	The Politician's Husband	Marcus Brock	TV series
2013–2016	Sarah & Duck	Narrator	TV series
2014	Bad Education	Maurice Hewston	TV series
2016	The Missing	Adrian Stone	TV series
2016	Ethel & Ernest	Middle Aged Doctor	Voice; TV film
2020	The Station: Trouble on the Tracks	Narrator	Documentary
2020	Uncle Vanya	Serebryakov	A TV film initially released in cinemas of the play performed at the Harold Pinter Theatre, London to an empty theatre due to Covid restrictions.
2022	Murder in Provence	Investigating Judge Antoine Verlaque	TV series
2022	The Sandman	Azazel	TV series
TBA	Berlin Noir	Ernst Gennat	Upcoming series

=== Theatre ===
Year	Title	Role	Theatre
1976	Vinegar Tom	Doctor/Man/Bellringer/Packer	Humberside Theatre, Hull
1979	Mary Barnes	Lecturer/Angie's brother	Royal Court Theatre
1981	Twin Rivals	Subtleman/Richmore	
1981	Two Gentlemen of Verona	Outlaw	
1981	Titus Andronicus	Demetrius	
1981, 1983	All's Well That Ends Well	Morgan	Royal Shakespeare Theatre (1981) Martin Beck Theatre (1983)
1982	Our Friends in the North	Conrad	
1982	Poppy	Lin	
1983	The Charge of the Light Brigade	Terence Gawain Hackett	RSC Festival
1983	Typhoid Mary	Dr Soper	RSC Festival
1984	Romeo and Juliet	Mercutio	Royal Shakespeare Theatre
1984	A Midsummer Night's Dream	Theseus/Oberon	
1984	Richard III	Clarence	Royal Shakespeare Theatre
1984	Today	Victor Ellison	
1984	The Party	Ford	
1985	The Dream Play	The Officer	
1985–1986	Les Misérables	Javert	Barbican Theatre (1985) Palace Theatre (1986)
1986	The Archbishop's Ceiling	Adrian	
1986	Heresies	Pimm	
1987	Measure for Measure	The Duke Vincentio	
1987	Twelfth Night	Sir Toby Belch	
1987	Julius Caesar	Brutus	
1989	The Fairy Queen	Oberon	Théâtre de l'Archevêché, Aix-en-Provence Festival
1990	The Seagull	Trigorin	
1990	Much Ado About Nothing	Benedick	Royal Shakespeare Theatre
1991	Dr. Jekyll and Mr. Hyde	Jekyll	
1992	Madras House	Philip Madras	Lyric Hammersmith
1992	Una Pooka	Angelo	Tricycle Theatre
1993	City of Angels	Stone	Prince of Wales Theatre
1994	Arcadia	Bernard Nightingale	Theatre Royal Haymarket
1995	The Importance of Being Earnest	Jack Worthing	Old Vic Theatre
1995	The Way of the World	Mirabell	National Theatre
1997–1998	ART	Serge (1997), Marc (1998)	Wyndham's Theatre
1996	Macbeth	Macbeth	
1996	The Learned Ladies	Trissotin	
1999	Summerfolk	Bassov	National Theatre
1999	Money	Henry Graves	National Theatre
1999	Troilus and Cressida	Ulysses	National Theatre
2000	The Cherry Orchard	Lopakhin	National Theatre
2000	Albert Speer	Adolf Hitler	National Theatre
2001	Privates on Parade	Terri Dennis	Donmar Warehouse
2002	What The Night Is For	Adam Penzius	Comedy Theatre
2003	The Woman in White	Performer	Sydmonton Festival
2003	Democracy	Willy Brandt	National Theatre
2004, 2005	Aladdin	Abbanazar	The Old Vic
2006	Blackbird	Ray	Albery Theatre
2006	Pravda	Lambert Le Roux	Chichester Festival Theatre, Birmingham Repertory Theatre
2007	Boeing, Boeing	Bernard	Comedy Theatre
2007	The Giant	Leonardo da Vinci	Hampstead Theatre
2008	Afterlife	Max Reinhardt	National Theatre
2009	La Cage aux Folles	Albin/Zaza	Playhouse Theatre
2009	God of Carnage	Michel Vallon	UK Tour
2010	Henry IV Parts 1 & 2	Falstaff	Shakespeare's Globe
2013	The Tempest	Prospero	Shakespeare's Globe
2014	Seminar	Leonard	Hampstead Theatre
2015	The Moderate Soprano	John Christie	Hampstead Theatre
2017	Limehouse	Roy Jenkins	Donmar Warehouse
2019	Rutherford and Son	John Rutherford, Sr	Royal National Theatre
2020	A Number	Salter	Bridge Theatre
2020	Uncle Vanya	Serebryakov	Harold Pinter Theatre, London
2023	Frank and Percy	Frank	The Theatre Royal, Windsor
2025	Churchill in Moscow	Churchill	Orange Tree Theatre
2026	How the Other Half Loves	Frank Foster	The Old Vic

=== Radio ===
Year	Title	Role	Notes
1992	Les Liaisons Dangereuses	Valmont	BBC Radio 4 adaptation
1992	The King's General	Sir Richard Grenvile.	BBC Radio 4 adaptation
1997	The Man in the Elephant Mask	Joseph Merrick.	BBC Radio 4 two-parter
2008	The Ring and the Book	Guido Franceschini	BBC Radio 4 adaptation
2008	Will Smith's Midlife Crisis Management	Will's godfather, Peter	BBC Radio 4 series
2008–2014	Cabin Pressure	First Officer Douglas Richardson.	Sitcom: four series on BBC Radio 4 and two specials
2010	Mark Lawson – What do you know?	DCI Parsons	BBC Radio 4 drama
2010–present	How Does That Make You Feel?	Richard Fallon MP	Ten series, BBC Radio 4 comedy
2011	The Magnificent Andrea	Barry	BBC Radio 4 comedy drama
2012	Blithe Spirit	Charles	BBC Radio 4 comedy
2014	Edmund Gosse – Father and Son	Philip Henry Gosse	BBC Radio 4 drama
2014–2015	War and Peace	General Mikhail Kutuzov	BBC Radio 4 adaptation, episode aired on New Years Day 2015
2018–present	Conversations from a Long Marriage	Husband	BBC Radio 4 comedy

=== Audiobooks ===
Allam has narrated several audiobooks, including Solar by Ian McEwan and An Introduction to Buddhism by the Dalai Lama.

He provided the narration for the 2005 recording of Weber's opera Oberon on the Philips label conducted by John Eliot Gardiner.

== See also ==
- List of British actors
