= John Christie (opera manager) =

British opera manager

- Born: 14 December 1882; Eggesford, Devon
- Died: 4 July 1962 (aged 79); East Sussex, England
- Education: Eton College, Trinity College
- Occupation: Theatrical producer
- Known for: Founder of Glyndebourne Opera House and Glyndebourne Festival Opera
- Spouse: Audrey Mildmay
- Family: William Christie (Grandfather), George Christie (Son)

John Christie CH MC (14 December 1882 – 4 July 1962) was an English landowner and theatrical producer. He was the founder of the Glyndebourne Opera House and the Glyndebourne Festival Opera at his home at Glyndebourne, near Lewes in East Sussex in 1934.

== Biography ==
Christie was born to a wealthy landed family in Eggesford, Devon, he was educated at Eton College and Trinity College, Cambridge, later spending seven years at Eton as a master. His grandfather was William Langham Christie. He served in the trenches in the First World War with the King's Royal Rifle Corps, despite partial blindness, was awarded the Military Cross, and reached the rank of captain. Having been given the Glyndebourne Estate for his own use he began to develop local enterprises there from 1920 onwards: in 1923, he acquired the famous organbuilding company of William Hill & Son & Norman & Beard Ltd., which had come into being around 1916 with the progressive merging of its two constituent firms. The firm remained in Christie ownership until its demise in the 1990s.

In 1931 he married the Canadian soprano Audrey Mildmay, and together they planned to build an opera theatre as an annex to the main house. This was completed in 1934 and the first season, which featured Mozart's The Marriage of Figaro and Così fan tutte, conducted by Fritz Busch, was an immediate success.

In succeeding years Christie continued to finance the Glyndebourne Festival Opera himself but after World War II, during which the opera season was suspended, the costs became harder to bear. Eventually however he succeeded in getting commercial sponsorship, placing the Festival on a sound footing and enabling him to aspire to the highest artistic standards.

In the 1954 New Year Honours, Christie was appointed a Member of the Order of the Companions of Honour (CH) for services to Opera.

He died at Glyndebourne in 1962. After Christie's death, the festival was taken over by his son, Sir George Christie, and subsequently by his grandson Gus Christie. Like his father, Sir George was also made a Member of the Order of the Companions of Honour for his work at Glyndebourne. John's founding of Glyndebourne is the subject of the 2015 biographical play The Moderate Soprano by David Hare.

== Sources ==
- Oxford Dictionary of National Biography
- Gervase "Spike" Hughes, Glyndebourne. A History of the Festival Opera founded in 1934 by Audrey and John Christie, London: Methuen, 1965
- Wilfrid Blunt, John Christie of Glyndebourne, London: Geoffrey Bles, 1969
- Glyndebourne – A Celebration, ed. John Higgins, London: Jonathan Cape, 1984
- John Julius Norwich, Fifty Years of Glyndebourne. An Illustrated History, London: Jonathan Cape, 1985
- Paul Campion; Rosy Runciman, Glyndebourne Recorded. Sixty Years of Recordings 1934–1994, London etc.: Julia MacRae, 1994
