= Murder in Provence =

2022 U.S.-U.K. television series

Murder in Provence is a British television mystery drama series based on the Verlacque and Bonnet detective novels by M. L. Longworth.

A U.S. and U.K. co-production between BritBox and ITV, the plans for adaptation were announced in 2021 and the first of three feature-length episodes became available on streaming services in March 2022.

Starring Roger Allam as Investigating Judge Antoine Verlacque and Nancy Carroll as Marine Bonnet, a criminal psychologist and Verlacque's romantic partner, the series is set and filmed in Aix-en-Provence in the south of France.

== Cast ==
- Roger Allam as Antoine Verlaque
- Nancy Caroll as Marine Bonnet
- Patricia Hodge as Florence Bonnet
- Keala Settle as Hélène Paulik
- Kirsty Bushell as Sylvie
- Geff Francis as François Roussel
- Christophe Tek as Philippe Leridon
- Samuel Barnett as Didier Laurent

== Episodes ==
=== Series 1 (2022) ===
No. overall	No. in series	Title	Directed by	Written by	Original U.K. air date
1	1	Episode #1.1	Chloe Thomas	Shelagh Stephenson	17 July 2022
Based on Murder in the Rue Dumas. An art history professor is found dead in his office at the university, and Verlacque must investigate a host of suspects, including the professor's colleagues who each hoped to have been chosen as his successor and their students who were competing for a fellowship.
2	2	Episode #1.2	Chloe Thomas	Shelagh Stephenson	24 July 2022
Based on Death at the Château Bremont. An aristocrat falls to his death from his family château, and not only is the matter personal for Bonnet, but Verlacque suspects the death was a criminal act rather than accidental.
3	3	Episode #1.3	Steve Barron	Shelagh Stephenson	31 July 2022
Based on Death in the Vines. A young woman's murder may be the result of a love affair, and Verlacque has to determine whether the death has a connection to the body of an older woman found in a vineyard miles away.
