= Pavillon Baltard =

Coordinates: 48°49′59″N 2°28′31″E

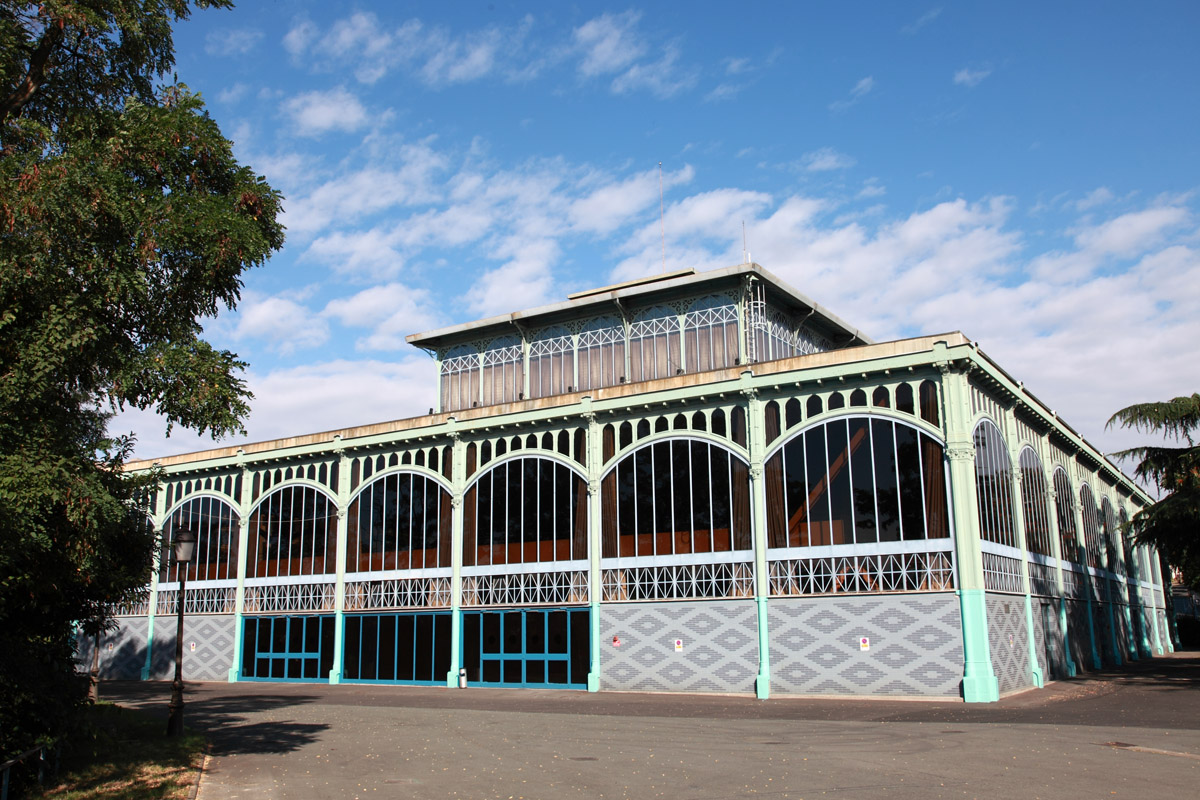
Pavillon Baltard

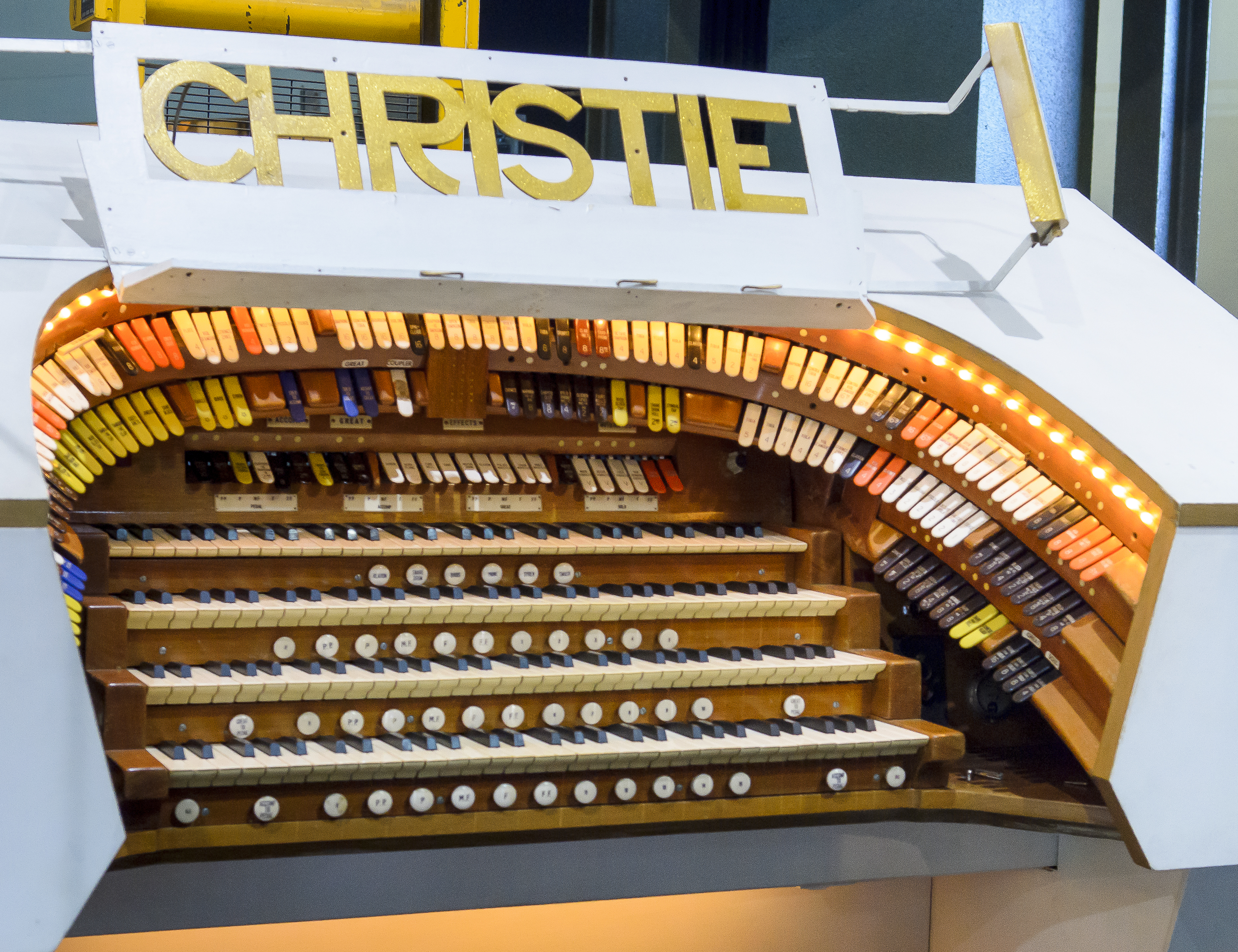
The console of the Pavillon's Christie Organ

Pavillon Baltard is a concert hall located in Nogent-sur-Marne, France. The structure, which was built in the 1850s by French architect Victor Baltard, was originally located in the heart of Paris before being moved to its current location in 1974. It was classified a historic monument in 1982. Notable artists to have performed at the venue include ZZ Top, Bob Marley, Iron Maiden, Thin Lizzy and UFO.

The Pavillon is home to the Christie organ originally built for the Gaumont Palace, Paris - Europe's biggest cinema - in 1930. The Organ was classified as a 'historic monument' on March 28, 1977, preventing it from leaving France. In need of restoration, it is being supported by the Association pour la Valorisation et le Rayonnement de l'Orgue de Cinéma (Organization for the Appreciation and the Promotion of the Cinema Organ.)
