= Shakespeare Prize =

20th-century award for artistic achievements

The Shakespeare Prize was an annual prize for writing or performance awarded to a British citizen by the Hamburg Alfred Toepfer Foundation. First given by Alfred Toepfer in 1937 as an expression of his Anglophilia in the face of tense international conditions, the prize was awarded only twice before the outbreak of World War II, to composer Ralph Vaughan Williams and poet John Masefield. The award resumed in 1967 following the visit of Queen Elizabeth to Germany and the last prize was awarded in 2006.

== Recipients ==
- 1937 Ralph Vaughan Williams
- 1938 John Masefield
- 1967 Sir Peter Hall
- 1968 Graham Greene
- 1969 Roy Pascal
- 1970 Harold Pinter
- 1971 Janet Baker
- 1972 Paul Scofield
- 1973 Peter Brook
- 1974 Graham Sutherland
- 1975 John Pritchard
- 1976 Philip Larkin
- 1977 Margot Fonteyn
- 1978 John Dexter
- 1979 Tom Stoppard
- 1980 Roy Strong
- 1981 John Schlesinger
- 1982 Doris Lessing
- 1983 David Hockney
- 1984 Colin Davis
- 1985 Alec Guinness
- 1986 Harold Jenkins
- 1987 Gwyneth Jones
- 1988 Iris Murdoch
- 1989 Peter Shaffer
- 1990 Neville Marriner
- 1991 Maggie Smith
- 1992 Richard Attenborough
- 1993 Julian Barnes
- 1994 Robert Burchfield
- 1995 George Christie
- 1996 Simon Rattle
- 1997 Howard Hodgkin
- 1998 Derek Jacobi
- 1999 Ian McEwan
- 2000 Sam Mendes
- 2001 Tony Cragg
- 2002 A. S. Byatt
- 2003 Matthew Bourne
- 2004 Paul Muldoon
- 2005 Richard Dawkins
- 2006 Bryn Terfel
