= Frank and Percy =

- Directed by: Sean Mathias
- Written by: Martin Sherman
- Based on: Frank and Percy by Ben Weatherill
- Produced by: John Gore; David Gilbery; Naomi George
- Starring: Ian McKellen; Roger Allam; Stephen Fry; Jessica Gunning; Joanna Lumley; Derek Jacobi; Ncuti Gatwa; Siân Phillips; Rob Brydon; Felicity Kendal
- Cinematography: Ryan Eddleston
- Edited by: Tania Goding
- Production companies: John Gore Studios; BK Studios
- Distributed by: Kaleidoscope Film Distribution
- Release date: 13 October 2026 (BFI)
- Country: United Kingdom
- Language: English

Frank and Percy is an upcoming British comedy film directed by Sean Mathias. It is based on the play of the same name by Ben Weatherill.

== Premise ==
A chance encounter between two elderly dogwalkers on Hampstead Heath leads them into a friendship they didn't expect, and a relationship potentially deeper than that.

== Cast ==
- Ian McKellen as Percy
- Roger Allam as Frank
- Stephen Fry
- Jessica Gunning as Emily
- Joanna Lumley as Belinda
- Derek Jacobi
- Ncuti Gatwa
- Siân Phillips
- Rob Brydon
- Felicity Kendal
- Peter Davison
- Gary Wilmot
- Sheila Hancock
- Nitin Ganatra
- Peter Straker
- Amari Bacchus
- Hugh Skinner
- Wayne Sleep

== Production ==
It was announced in September 2025 that the Ben Weatherill play was being adapted into a film, with Ian McKellen and Roger Allam reprising their roles. Stephen Fry, Jessica Gunning, Joanna Lumley, Derek Jacobi, Ncuti Gatwa and Siân Phillips were also announced to star.

Filming had begun in London by October, with Rob Brydon, Felicity Kendal, Peter Davison and Gary Wilmot among additional casting announced the following month.

== Release ==
Frank and Percy had its world premiere at the 70th BFI London Film Festival on October 13, 2026.

== Reception ==
The critic Peter Bradshaw from The Guardian, gave the film 3 stars out of 5, calling out the film's tender sweetness in reflecting an romance in later years. He also praised the part played by Joanna Lumley as a sister-in-law to Frank who is in early-onset dementia.

The critic Dr Bob Mann at One Mann's Movies, giving the film 4 stars out of 5, described it as a warm, charming, funny, gay-love story commenting that mixed in with the humour was the "tart sting of pathos", bringing in themes of grief and loneliness.
