= Gaumont-Palace =

Historic cinema in Paris

Coordinates: 48.8851°N 2.3297°E

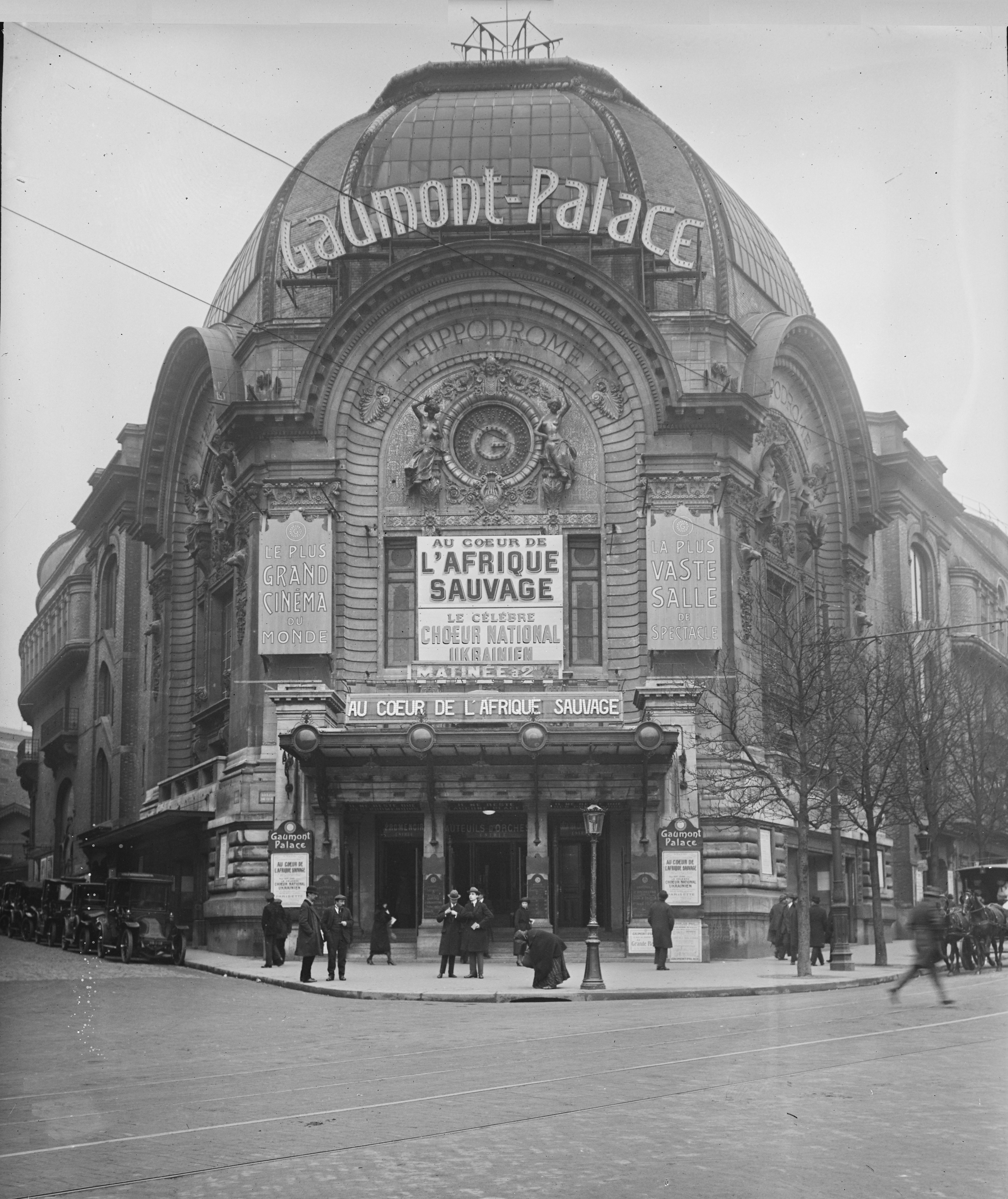
- The original exterior of the cinema in 1922
- Interactive map of the Gaumont-Palace area
- Former names: Hippodrome de Montmartre

General information
- Architectural style: Belle Époque (original), Art Deco (reconstruction)
- Location: Rue Caulaincourt, Paris, France
- Opened: 13 May 1900
- Owner: Gaumont (1910–1972)

Other information
- Seating capacity: 4,850

The Gaumont-Palace was a cinema located on Rue Caulaincourt in the Montmartre district of Paris, France.

== History ==
Originally constructed between 1898 (Note: The foundation stone was laid on 16 January 1898.) and 1900 as the Hippodrome de Montmartre for the 1900 Exposition Universelle, it staged equestrian shows during its early life, and for a period was owned by Frank C. Bostock. Later, it became a skating rink. Originally built with a Belle Époque facade, the building was acquired by Léon Gaumont in July 1910 and was subsequently converted into a cinema. When opened on 30 September 1911, (Note: The date of opening is given as 30 September by one source and 11 October by another. However, it was reported in the press that the cinema would open on the former date, and also that inaugural programme was to end on 7 October.) it was the largest movie theatre in the world with 3,400 seats,then 6,400 places after its renovation and was the first in France to boast automatic projection equipment. It remained part of the Gaumont empire throughout its history. It was destroyed in 1973.

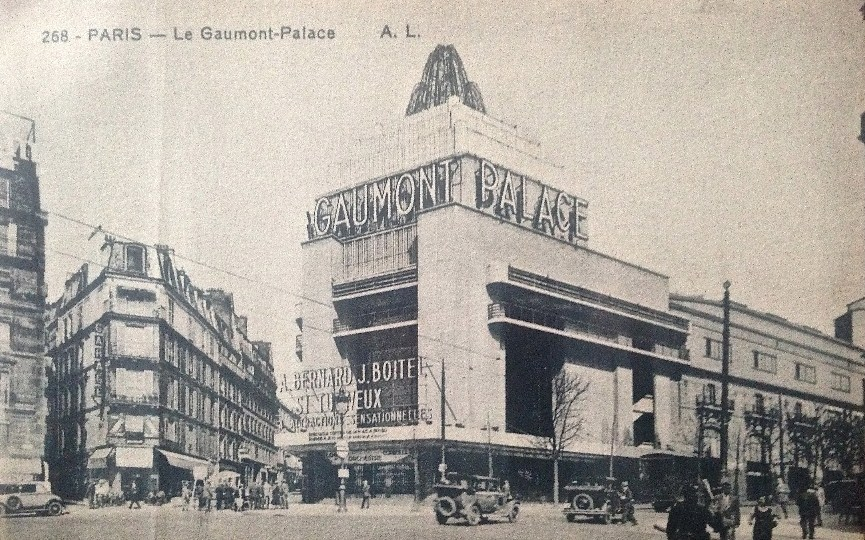
The rebuilt cinema with its new Art Deco façade in 1931

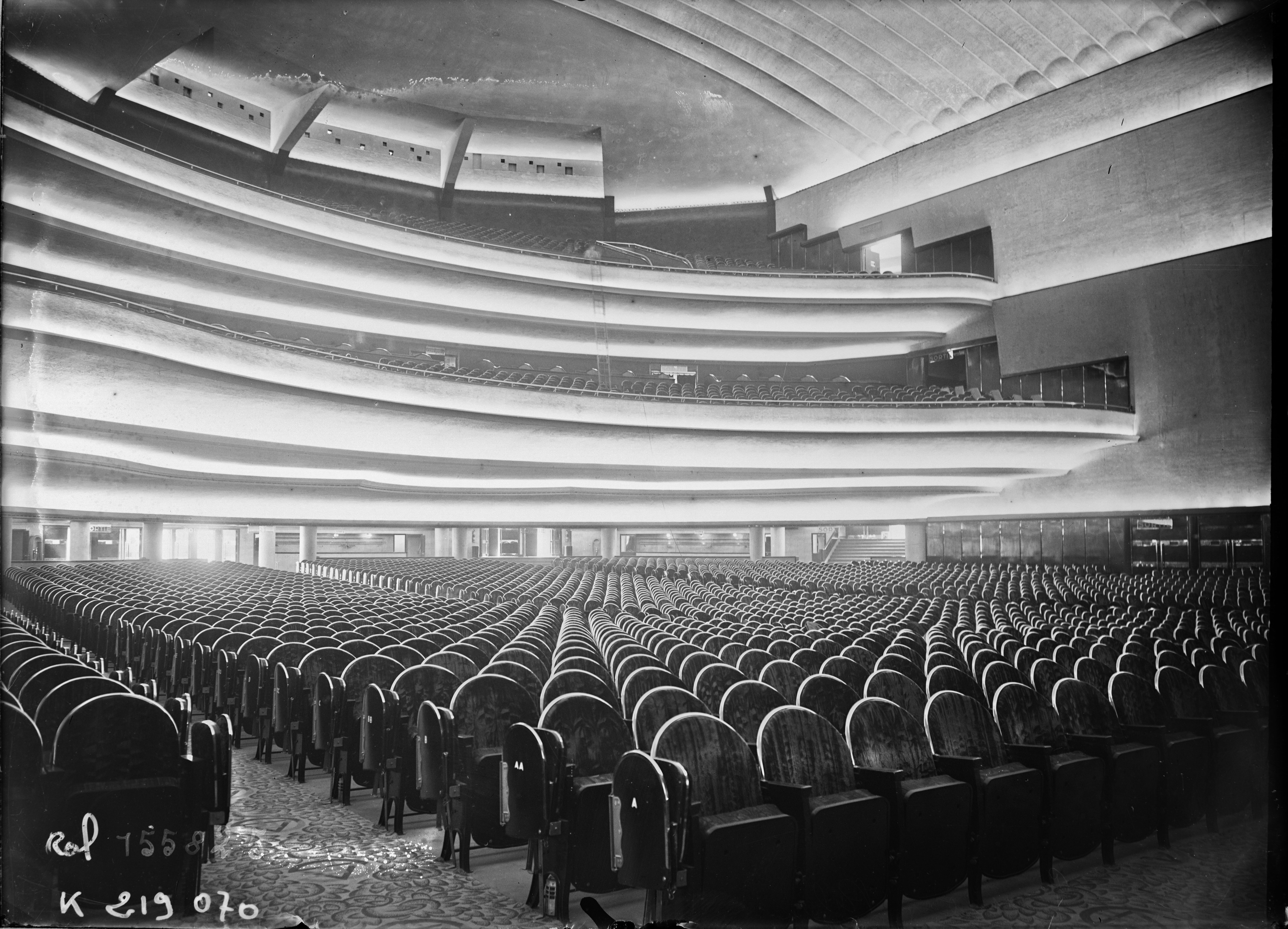
Interior of the Gaumont Palace in 1931

In 1930–31, Gaumont spent 40 million francs rebuilding the cinema to a design by Henri Belloc, (Note: In the aftermath of World War I, Belloc had been employed by Louis Aubert as the architect on two prestigious cinema projects.) Art Deco exterior. The largest cinema in France, it was used to premiere major productions from both France and abroad. With a capacity of 4,850, (Note: Gaumont stated in its publicity material that the cinema could accommodate an audience of 6,000, but although this figure has been widely quoted ever since, internal company documents reveal that in reality there were 1,150 fewer seats.) it commonly attracted between fifty and sixty thousand spectators a week in the early 1930s, with box office receipts of 21.3 million francs in 1932. The size of the cinema meant that it rarely held films over for more than two weeks before they were switched to smaller venues in the city such as the Caméo cinema. At the end of World War II, the Gaumont-Palace acted as a repatriation centre for returning prisoners of war, and in this capacity is mentioned in La Douleur (1985) by Marguerite Duras. It had earlier served as the model for Le Tarapout in Louis-Ferdinand Céline's novel Voyage au bout de la nuit (1932).

In 1952, the cinema featured in the comedy film Holiday for Henrietta. In 1962, it was converted for the use of Cinerama widescreen format. Increasingly, its large size was considered a disadvantage, due to poor audio quality. Plans were made for a further reconstruction but these were abandoned. In 1972, Gaumont sold the 7,000-square-feet site for 35 million francs, the cinema being demolished the following year to make way for a shopping gallery and hotel. The money the company received from the sale allowed it to renovate other parts of its cinema chain, including in Lille, Lyon, Marseille, Bordeaux, Reims, Nice and Toulouse.

== Cinema organ ==
The Gaumont-Palace had two organs during its lifetime, the first of these being a "church organ" built by Aristide Cavaillé-Coll, which was mentioned in several programmes dating from 1913 and 1914. About 1931, a four-manual "Christie" theatre organ was supplied by Hill, Norman and Beard. (Note: Sources disagree over the first person to play this organ and whether it was installed in 1930, 1931, or 1932.) Now classified as a monument historique, it is preserved in the Pavillon Baltard at Nogent-sur-Marne, and is the only organ of its size in France to still exist.

== Bibliography ==
- Abel, Richard (1994). The Cine Goes to Town: French Cinema, 1896–1914 (Updated and Expanded ed.). Berkeley: University of California Press. ISBN 978-0520079366. JSTOR jj.5973123.
- Choukroun, Jacques (2008). Comment le parlant a sauvé le cinéma français: Une histoire economique 1928–1939 [How the Talkies Saved French Cinema: An Economic History, 1928–1939] (in French). Paris: Association française de recherche sur l'histoire du cinéma. ISBN 978-2913758759.
- Crisp, Colin (2002). Genre, Myth and Convention in the French Cinema, 1929–1939. Bloomington: Indiana University Press. ISBN 0253340721.
- Garçon, François (1994). Gaumont: A History of French Cinema. Translated by Alderman, Bruce & Dickinson, Jonathan. New York: Harry N. Abrams, Inc. ISBN 0810925796.
- Hewitt, Nicholas (2017). Montmartre : A Cultural History. Liverpool: Liverpool University Press. ISBN 978-1786940230.
- Housseinabadi, Shahram (2012). Une histoire architecturale de cinémas: Genèse et métamorphoses de l'architecture cinématographique à Paris [An Architectural History of Cinemas: The Origins and Development of Cinema Architecture in Paris] (Doctoral thesis) (in French). University of Strasbourg.
