= The Christophers (film) =

2025 film by Steven Soderbergh

- Theatrical release poster
- Directed by: Steven Soderbergh
- Written by: Ed Solomon
- Produced by: Iain A. Canning; Jim Parks
- Starring: Ian McKellen; Michaela Coel; James Corden; Jessica Gunning
- Cinematography: Peter Andrews
- Edited by: Mary Ann Bernard
- Music by: David Holmes
- Production companies: Department M Butler & Sklar Productions
- Distributed by: Neon (United States); Picturehouse Entertainment (United Kingdom)
- Release dates: September 7, 2025 (TIFF); April 10, 2026 (United States); May 15, 2026 (United Kingdom)
- Running time: 100 minutes
- Countries: United States; United Kingdom
- Language: English
- Box office: $4.8 million

The Christophers is a 2025 black comedy film directed by Steven Soderbergh and written by Ed Solomon. It stars Ian McKellen, Michaela Coel, Jessica Gunning, and James Corden.

The film premiered at the Toronto International Film Festival on September 7, 2025, followed by a limited theatrical release in the United States on April 10, 2026, by Neon.

== Plot ==
Julian Sklar is a well-known painter based in London, elderly and eccentric. In the 1990s, he completed two series of paintings called "The Christophers" based on his lover at the time; a third series of "Christophers" remained unfinished, and he has not worked on them in years. His reputation has faded as he has aged. His unscrupulous children Barnaby and Sallie hire Lori Butler, a young artist who has not exhibited in years, to pose as his assistant and finish the "Christophers" behind his back. They plan to sell the finished "Julian Sklar" paintings for a fortune after his death.

Lori meets Julian, who spends much of his time recording Cameos for his fans to earn a living. He soon orders her to shred the unfinished "Christophers"; instead, she forges doubles of each and shreds the fakes. Julian, who is sharper than he initially appears, soon deduces that Lori is an artist and that she has been hired by his children. She confesses, and their friendship grows stronger as she demonstrates her knowledge of his work and criticizes his second series of "Christophers." Barnaby and Sallie, visiting to check on Lori's progress, are fooled by Julian and Lori into believing the shredded fakes were the real paintings, upsetting their scheme.

Julian decides to burn the unfinished third series of "Christophers" and orders Lori to do it. She refuses and tells him to do it himself if he wishes. When he hesitates, she brings them back up to his studio, where Julian decides to finish them in such a terrible manner that they will be unsaleable. In a moment of artistic joy, he adds glitter, feathers and other ornaments to two of the unfinished paintings before stopping. He accuses Lori of manipulating him into finishing the paintings and criticizes her work, which he has examined online. She leaves his employ.

Lori, frustrated, briefly renews her scheme with Barnaby and Sallie, deducing that they have already pre-sold the paintings, and are in debt. Later Julian visits her at her shared art studio and declares that he was wrong to judge her work without seeing it in person. He realizes that years earlier, he had criticized her harshly on a television program, leading her to stop exhibiting. They repair their relationship, and he asks her to return to work for him in a week or so. Before she can, Julian dies and is found with a paintbrush in hand by his masseuse.

Soon afterward, Lori takes the real "Christophers" from the house, and continues work on the paintings, adding feathers, yarn, and sequins, and slashing the canvas. She forges a letter in Julian's name granting ownership of the works to the actual Christopher—Julian's former lover. At a museum show honoring Julian's legacy, Christopher exhibits the portraits—all of them now finished in the "unsaleable" style. Alongside them, Lori has produced a modern work honouring Julian by combining dozens of his Cameo videos. The masseuse gives Lori Julian's final painting—an unfinished self-portrait—signed "for Lori" on the back.

== Cast ==
- Ian McKellen as Julian Sklar
- Michaela Coel as Lori Butler
- James Corden as Barnaby Sklar
- Jessica Gunning as Sallie Sklar
- Tilly Botsford as Esme
- Daniel Fearn as locksmith
- Lucy McCormick and Le Fil as Lori's flatmates
- Dallas Campbell as Art Fight moderator
- Ferdy Roberts as Owen Appleton

== Production ==
The film was produced by Department M, with Michael Schaefer and Mike Larocca as executive producers.

Principal photography took place in February 2025 in London. Filming locations included Fitzrovia in the London Borough of Camden. David Holmes composed the score for the film.

== Release ==
The Christophers premiered at the Toronto International Film Festival on September 7, 2025. In October, Neon acquired distribution rights to the film, scheduling it for a limited theatrical release in Los Angeles and New York City on April 10, 2026, followed by a nationwide expansion later that spring. The film was released in the United Kingdom and Ireland on 15 May 2026, by Picturehouse Entertainment.

== Reception ==
On the review aggregator website Rotten Tomatoes, 95% of 174 critics' reviews are positive, with an average rating of 7.8/10. The website's consensus reads: "A sly caper carried off with director Steven Soderbergh's characteristic panache, The Christophers is a superb two-hander featuring Ian McKellen and Michaela Coel at their very best." Metacritic, which uses a weighted average, assigned the film a score of 79 out of 100, based on 42 critics, indicating "generally favorable" reviews.

In The Guardian, Peter Bradshaw gave the film 5 stars and wrote "McKellen is voluble, needling, vulnerable and pathetic; Coel is calm and withholding. ... The double act of McKellen and Coel has the onscreen chemistry of the year." In Empire, John Nugent gave 4/5 stars, writing: "There’s Soderbergh’s careful, sly, unshowy direction, which keeps things compelling. There’s the delicious original script by Ed Solomon (Bill & Ted and Men In Black), full of poison-tongued dialogue and rug-pulling turns. And there are sublime performances from its leads, Ian McKellen and Michaela Coel, both absolutely at the top of their game."

In The Independent, Clarisse Loughrey also gave 4/5 stars, writing: "[Soderbergh's] camera hovers eagerly like a third body in the room, crouched behind bits of furniture or stood unobtrusively off to the side. If that observer ever had anything to say, I doubt Julian would let them. McKellen’s work here is his best since his Gandalf days, reinterpreting the elder artist into a mad king, fuelled and decimated by his own ego."Kate Stables wrote for the BFI: "McKellen’s sparkling performance, an expert and energetic blend of foxy charm and casual cruelty, is what truly sets the film humming. ... For a film about approaching death, and the sudden, devastating loss of talent that may precede it, it’s a surprisingly sparky movie – one that exudes warmth and life."

For Deadline, reviewer Damon Wise wrote that because it's a Soderbergh film, one would expect a twist, but that "the twist here is that there isn't really a twist" and goes on to call it an "unusually emotional film for Soderbergh".
