= Roy Pascal =

English Germanist (1904–1980)

Roy Pascal FBA (28 February 1904 – 24 August 1980) was an English academic and scholar of German literature. After an early career at the University of Cambridge, he was Professor of German at the University of Birmingham from 1939 to 1969.

== Early life and education ==
Roy Pascal was born in Saltley, Birmingham, on 28 February 1904; his father, Colin Sydney Pascal (1866/7–1949), ran a grocery store with his wife (and Pascal's mother) Mary (née Edmonds; 1866/7–1953). The younger Pascal studied at King Edward's School, Birmingham, as a Foundation Scholar and a King's Scholar. The school then did not have a strong reputation for modern foreign languages; he was taught German by Miltiades Acatos, a Greek who had studied in Germany, but it was a "rough and ready" education which scarcely dealt with literature. When Pascal applied for a scholarship to Sidney Sussex College, Cambridge, in 1921 he failed to secure a place; but, the following year he won a scholarship to Pembroke College, Cambridge, based on his Higher School Certificate examination.

Pascal found most of the teaching at Cambridge dull, save for lectures by E. K. Bennett, who encouraged a sensitivity to literature and writing which inspired Pascal. But more still, a trip to Berlin in 1924, financed by a college tutor, brought Pascal in direct contact with German culture, especially the Völkisch movement's influence on the arts, the anti-British sentiment in university history teaching, and the country's youth movements. He was thereafter, in the words of A. V. Subiotto, committed to "relate [his] academic studies as far as possible to the contemporary world of Germany". Martin Swales commented that the trip to Berlin galvanised "His literary interests (especially his love for Goethe's poetry), his quickened sense of the interplay of ideas and socio-historical reality, and his political awakening, above all to the dangers of fascism" and "convinced him to devote his professional life to Germany and to things German."

After graduating with a first-class degree in French and German three years later, he received the Tiarks scholarship and studied the philosopher, poet and mystic known as Novalis in Germany; but he would eventually abandon those investigations. He immersed himself in German culture once again, while in Berlin and Munich, before returning to Pembroke as a modern languages supervisor in 1928.

== Career ==
Pascal was elected a fellow of Pembroke in 1929; between 1934 and 1936, he was university lecturer in German, and then returned to Pembroke as a fellow (until 1939), when he was appointed Professor of German at the University of Birmingham, in which position he remained until 1969. At Cambridge, he taught German at Pembroke and his pupils included C. P. Magill, Trevor Jones and F. J. Stopp. He also lectured on Baroque literature and the Reformation, the former being a topic barely studied in English universities at the time. His lectures on Martin Luther formed the basis of his first book, The Social Basis of the German Reformation: Luther and his Times (1933). It was a Marxist endeavour, and an attempt to connect German literature with its social and cultural context. After returning to Cambridge, Pascal joined the Labour Party (he would be greatly inspired by the literature of the German left during the 1920s and early 1930s) and believed that, in the midst of hyperinflation and the Wall Street crash, British reparation demands were damaging moderate political parties and radicalising German politics. In the United Kingdom, Pascal also sympathised with the Communist Party; his far left politics and his advocacy over reparations and Germany joining the League of Nations meant that his fellowship at Pembroke was not renewed after five years (although he remained at Cambridge as a lecturer).

Pascal continued to protest the emergence of the far right in Germany; his 1934 book The Nazi Dictatorship outlined his critique of Hitler's regime, and in 1936 he unsuccessfully proposed that the Conference of University Teachers of German formally condemn the treatment of Jewish and liberal academics in Germany. During this time, Pascal was also drawn to the early writings of Karl Marx, and in 1938 translated his The German Ideology; he found the work useful for engaging with German history and culture. During and immediately after the Second World War, Pascal wrote a number of histories in which explored the origins of German nationalism, notably The Growth of Modern Germany (1946) and The German Revolution of 1848 (1948).

His chair at Birmingham allowed Pascal to reform the curriculum for German teaching; he aimed for it to emphasise the connections between literature, cultural, history and society, and appointed Bill Lockwood, Richard Hinton Thomas and Siegbert Prawer, among others, to the department. After the fall of Nazi Germany, Pascal's works focused more fully on literary subjects. The German Sturm und Drang appeared in 1953, followed by The German Novel three years later, and Design and Truth in Autobiography in 1960. He also authored From Naturalism to Expressionism (1973), The Dual Voice (1977) and Kafka's Narrators (1982; published posthumously). Somewhat ironically, by the late 1960s a new generation of students—many returning from semesters spent in German universities—espoused the radical politics of the New Left and at least superficially 'Marxist' ideas; Pascal, as head of the department at Birmingham, came under attack as an authoritarian, elite figure. As one obituarist commented, this new ideology "purported to be Marxist in inspiration—an ironic contrast to Pascal's own lifelong endeavours to fructify literary criticism [in the United Kingdom] with Marxist elements". Amid growing critique and protest from some students in his department, Pascal secured early retirement in 1969 and resigned from his chair, before spending a year as visiting professor at McMaster University, Canada.

Pascal enjoyed sports, painting and cabinet-making, and possessed a detailed knowledge of the countryside and architectural history. In retirement, he continued researching and writing, but his health gradually failed over the course of the 1970s. He died of heart failure on 24 August 1980 at his home on Witherford Way, Selly Oak, Birmingham. He had met his wife, Fania (or Feiga; née Polianovskaya, daughter of Moses, a timber merchant) in Berlin, and she survived him, as did their two daughters.

== Honours, awards, assessment and legacy ==
Pascal was awarded the Goethe Medal in 1965 and the Shakespeare Prize four years later. Also in 1969, to mark his sixty-fifth birthday and in spite of his recent resignation from Birmingham, Pascal was the dedicatee of a festschrift: Essays in German Language, Culture and Society. He was elected a Fellow of the British Academy in 1970; Birmingham awarded him an honorary doctor of laws degree in 1974, and in 1977 the University of Warwick appointed him an honorary DLitt. He was invited to give the Bithell Memorial Lecture in 1977 as well, but could not give it in person due to ill health; Brecht's Misgivings was nonetheless published by the Institute of German Studies.

One obituarist recalled that even after the end of the Second World War, Pascal appeared "an oddity in German studies, and for many colleagues there always clung an aura to him, quite erroneously, the aura of a scholar with a political axe to grind that made his literary criticism faintly suspect". Martin Swales wrote in the Oxford Dictionary of National Biography that he was nevertheless "admired and loved by the generality of the profession", and A. V. Subiotto summarised that he "[produced] a steady and impressive output of academic scholarship spanning half a century and embracing several disciplines. The whole corpus of his work can be claimed as evidence that Roy Pascal was perhaps the most distinguished Germanist this country has produced..."

== Select bibliography ==
- The Social Basis of the German Reformation: Luther and his Times (1933).
- The Nazi Dictatorship (1934).
- The Growth of Modern Germany (1946).
- The German Revolution of 1848 (1948).
- The German Sturm und Drang (1953)
- The German Novel: Studies (1956)
- Design and Truth in Autobiography (1960).
- "New directions in modern language studies", Modern Languages (1965).
- From Naturalism to Expressionism (1973).
- The Dual Voice (1977).
- Kafka's Narrators (posthumously published, 1982).
