= William Hill & Son & Norman & Beard Ltd. =

Organ builders

William Hill & Son & Norman & Beard Limited (commonly known as Hill, Norman and Beard) were a major pipe organ manufacturer originally based in Norfolk.

== History ==
They were founded in 1916 by the merger of Norman and Beard and William Hill & Son of London, Dr Arthur George Hill having no male heirs to sustain his business, moving its production to the capital in 1916. The merged company was bought by John Christie in 1923, and remained in the Christie family until the business was wound up in 1998.

Amongst others, the company built the four manual organ in Norwich Cathedral (1899, rebuilds and upgrades in 1940–42, 1950 and 1969), the 5038 pipe instrument in Lichfield Cathedral (1899, rebuilds 1908 and 1974). and the chapel organ of Ellesmere College, Shropshire.

Under Christie's leadership, a subsidiary was founded in Australia in 1927, which continued in business until 1974. During that time the Australian company built 86 new organs and 98 rebuilds, as well as carrying out many other repairs and maintenance work.

== Christie theatre organs ==
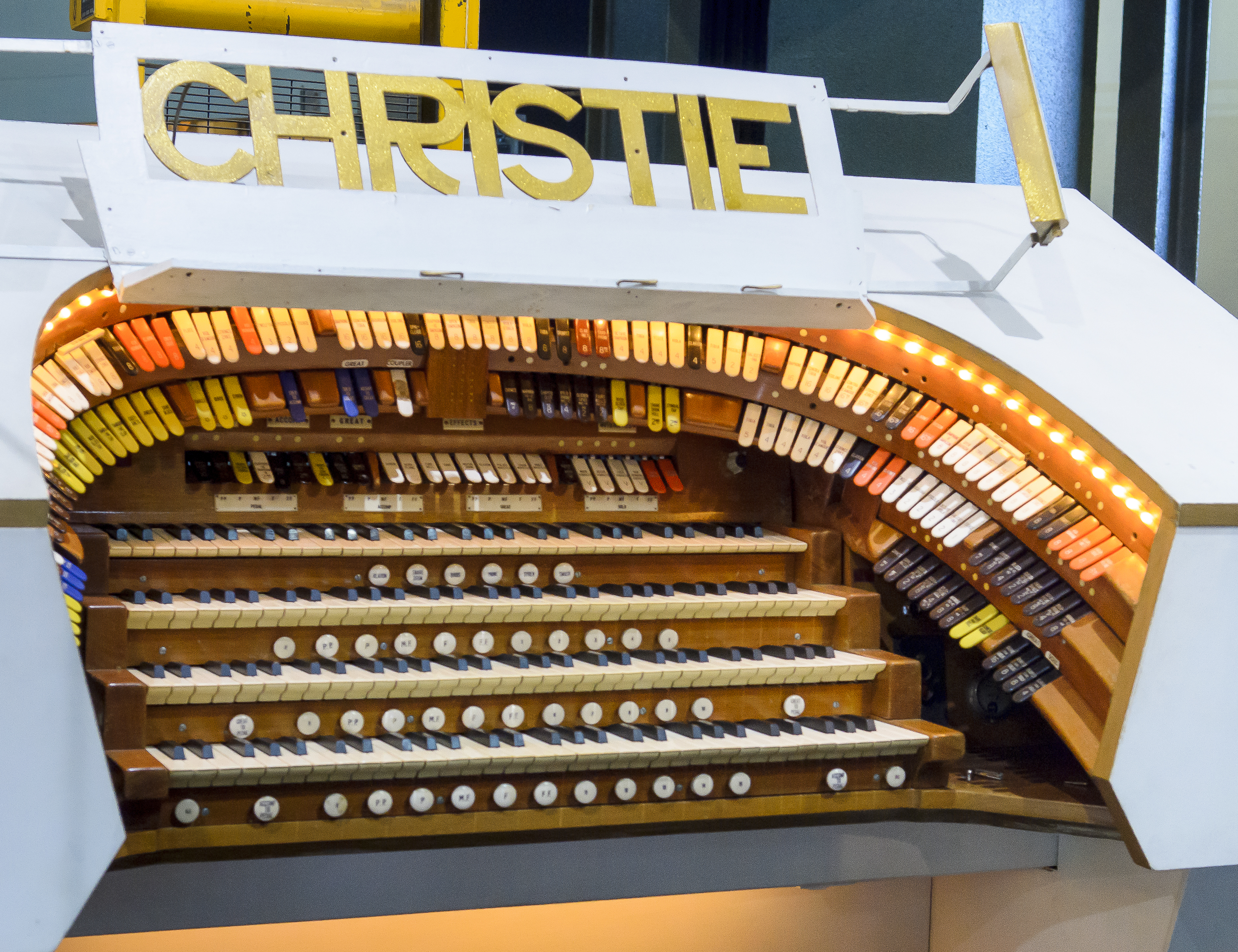
The console of the Christie Organ at the Pavillon Baltard

During the era of silent films, the company produced theatre pipe organs between 1926 and 1938. These instruments were produced under the brand name Christie, from the name of John Christie, the owner of the business. The components were produced in one the company's various factories (Brighton, Norwich, London etc.) and assembled, together with other specialist items such as percussions and consoles, at their King's Cross factory.

During the late 1920s, up to 40 Christie organs were produced each year. The location of 21 of the UK-installed models is currently known, as of July 2014. 30 Christie Organs (and an additional 3 Christie-based composite organs) are known to have been installed in Australia, including at the Enfield Savoy Theatre.

=== Famous instruments ===
Among the organs produced was the largest cinema organ built outside the United States, for the Regal Cinema, Marble Arch. This four-manual thirty-unit organ was fitted with 2,514 pipes, a 32-note carillon (the only real organ-operated carillon in the United Kingdom) and a wide variety of special sound effects to accompany the films, although being only the tenth Christie that they had built.

A Christie organ was also built for the Gaumont Palace, Paris - Europe's biggest cinema, with 6,000 seats - in 1930. After the building closed, the organ was removed and eventually installed at the Pavillon Baltard in Nogent sur Marne. The Organ was classified as a 'historic monument' on 28 March 1977, preventing it from leaving France. In need of restoration, it is being supported by the Association pour la Valorisation et le Rayonnement de l'Orgue de Cinéma (Organization for the Appreciation and the Promotion of the Cinema Organ.)
