= The Archbishop's Ceiling =

Drama written by Arthur Miller

The Archbishop's Ceiling is a drama written in the 1970s by Arthur Miller. It was originally produced at the John F. Kennedy Center, with forty performances in April and May 1977, but failed to attract the attention of Broadway. Miller subsequently re-worked the play, with a revised script premiering at Cleveland Play House in 1984 under the direction of Jonathan Bolt.

The setting is an ornate room in a former Archbishop's palace in an Eastern European capital, a room which has probably been bugged by the secret police. The central character is a middle-aged author, Sigmund, who, having embarrassed the current regime, is faced with the choice of detention and punishment or defection to the West. He is encouraged in the latter by two of his former friends, also writers, his compatriot Marcus, an ex-political prisoner now in favor with the regime, and Adrian, a visiting American with strongly liberal ideals. The situation is complicated by the presence of Maya, a poet and actress, who has been the mistress of all three. It is the complexity of the relationship of these four, the inextricable interweaving of politics, art and sex, and the constant uncertainty as to whether what they say may be overheard that makes for a rich and deeply intriguing play - and one which raises questions not only about morality but individual responsibility.

== Characters ==
Adrian; Maya; Marcus; Irina; Sigmund
