= Mary Christie, Lady Christie =

British arts administrator

Patricia Mary Christie, Lady Christie (née Nicholson; 16 May 1937 – 4 June 2020) was a British arts administrator. She was the wife of Sir George Christie.
