= George Christie (opera manager) =

British opera manager

Sir George William Langham Christie CH DL (31 December 1934 – 7 May 2014) was a British opera administrator, long affiliated with Glyndebourne Opera. He was the son of John Christie and Audrey Mildmay.

== Biography ==
Christie attended Eton, and later Trinity College, Cambridge, although he left without taking a degree. He then worked at the Gulbenkian Foundation for five years, before returning to Glyndebourne. In 1962, following the death of his father, he took over the organisation.

During his tenure at Glyndebourne, Christie broadened the company's finances through increased corporate sponsorship. The company's repertoire also expanded, including commissions of new operas. He also oversaw the demolition of the old theatre and construction of the new theatre, over the period 1992–1994. In addition, the company began its Glyndebourne Touring Opera (now Glyndebourne on Tour) in 1968, its first outreach ensemble. Christie retired from the company on 31 December 1999, and handed over control of the company to his son Gus Christie.

Christie was knighted in the 1984 Birthday Honours, and appointed a Member of the Order of the Companions of Honour (CH) in the 2002 New Year Honours for services to Opera and to Glyndebourne Opera Festival. In 1995 the Hamburg-based Alfred Toepfer Foundation awarded Christie its annual Shakespeare Prize in recognition of his life's work. In 2013, he won a special Lifetime Achievement Award at the Opera Awards in London.

Christie married Mary Nicholson in 1958. The couple had four children, Hector, Gus, Ptolemy and Louise. His widow and children all survived him. Hector Christie is the owner of Tapeley Park. Louise Flind joined the Glyndebourne board and Ptolemy Christie is a stage director. Lady Christie (née Mary Nicholson) died of cancer of 2020 at the age of 83.

Sir George and Lady Christie's second eldest son, Gus, is currently chairman of Glyndebourne Festival Opera.
