= Audrey Mildmay =

English-Canadian singer

Grace Audrey Laura St John-Mildmay (19 December 1900 – 31 May 1953) was an English and Canadian soprano and co-founder, with her husband, John Christie, of Glyndebourne Festival Opera. The Canadian Encyclopedia describes her voice "as a light lyric soprano employed with much charm."

== Early life and career ==
Grace Audrey Louisa St. John Mildmay was born in Herstmonceux, Sussex, England. Her father was Sir Aubrey St John Mildmay, Bt, a British Anglican priest, and when she was three months old he accepted the parish of Penticton, British Columbia in Canada. She initially studied the piano, but a singing teacher discovered the potential of her voice.

Mildmay first appeared publicly in a children's operetta production sponsored by the Vancouver Woman's Musical Club at the age of 18. She travelled to London to study with Walter Johnstone Douglas at the Webber Douglas Academy of Dramatic Art in 1924. In 1927–28, she toured the United States and Canada as Polly in a production of The Beggar's Opera. She returned to the United Kingdom and joined the Carl Rosa Opera Company with which she sang, amongst other roles, Musetta in La bohème, Gretel in Hansel and Gretel, Micaëla in Carmen, Nedda in Pagliacci and Zerlina in Don Giovanni, earning £2 10s a week.

== Marriage ==
Mildmay's teacher Johnstone Douglas suggested to John Christie that she sing the part of Blonde in an amateur production of Act I of Mozart's Die Entführung aus dem Serail in December 1930. Christie was a music lover who modified his house at Glyndebourne to be able to host concerts for his family and friends. Mildmay was paid £5 for her appearance in a hilarious performance, full of comic mishaps. The 48-year-old bachelor Christie was immediately smitten by the much younger Mildmay's charm and vivacity, and during a tour of the house, he impulsively showed her the room that he said they would share after their marriage. He showered her with gifts after her departure, including hampers from Fortnum & Mason because he felt she was too thin. Mildmay was unsure, asking for time to decide and begging Christie not to fall in love with her.

Mildmay's caution notwithstanding, the two were married on 4 June 1931 in Queen Camel, Somerset, the home of her uncle. The pair honeymooned in Germany and Austria on an opera tour, during which Mildmay had an operation for appendicitis. Christie felt that his appendix might be slightly tender too, and had it removed as well "to keep her company". After they recovered, the couple continued their opera tour, before returning to Glyndebourne.

== Glyndebourne ==
After their return and prompted by Mildmay and her colleagues, Christie determined that, rather than extend the Organ Room at Glyndebourne, he would build a proper opera theatre in which the highest quality opera could be performed. The building work took several years, fully occupying Christie. Critics claimed that Christie was merely seeking to provide a showcase for his wife, but while she was to sing often at the new theatre, she remained a member of the ensemble.

Mildmay had a history of tonsillitis, and after a tonsillectomy began studying with the Hungarian singing teacher Jani Strasser in Vienna. She also sang opera roles in Brighton and concerts at Glyndebourne itself. She and Christie had a daughter, Rosamond, in October 1933, and a son, George, in December 1934. After the birth of her daughter Mildmay continued with her studies in Vienna, leaving Rosamond behind in England. Based on his letters of the time, Christie was more interested in his building project than his child, for example writing to his wife "I saw Baby tonight, it smiled at me".

Two refugees from Nazi Germany, the conductor Fritz Busch and director Carl Ebert, were appointed to lead the first season, and Rudolf Bing joined them, at first as a jack-of-all-trades but in later seasons as director. The inaugural Glyndebourne Festival opened on 28 May 1934 with Mildmay, who was two months pregnant with her second child, singing Susanna in The Marriage of Figaro. The conductor, Fritz Busch, insisted Mildmay audition for him before giving her the role, and she accepted the condition willingly. Busch wrote in his notes about the quality of her voice, and stated that he would have engaged her for the Semperoper in Dresden. She sang Zerlina in 1936 and Norina in Don Pasquale in 1939 to critical acclaim.

The festival was soon recognised as an outstanding artistic event. Mildmay contributed to this through "her tireless work during the opera seasons, seamlessly combining the roles of principal singer, hostess, chatelaine, mother, wife and friend". Her charm, wit and kindness were widely remembered and appreciated. Mildmay continued her own singing career in Europe during the 1930s, including a successful concert tour of Germany, Hungary and Austria in 1936, and opera performances in Belgium. She was invited to sing at the Salzburg Festival in 1939, but refused the invitation after taking advice from the Foreign Office.

Mildmay also recorded several operas, including The Marriage of Figaro (1934), Don Giovanni (1936) and The Beggar's Opera (1940).

== Second World War ==
From the outbreak of World War II in 1939 until 1946 the Glyndebourne Festival was cancelled. However, in 1940 Mildmay appeared, with Michael Redgrave and Roy Henderson in a British touring opera production of The Beggar's Opera directed by John Gielgud. During a visit to Edinburgh as part of the tour, Mildmay remarked to Rudolf Bing, "What a place for a Festival!" The comment was to prove a catalyst for the founding of the Edinburgh International Festival. In July 1940, Mildmay, her two children, a governess and goddaughter moved to Canada. Christie was not permitted to give financial help to his family, so Mildmay sang concerts throughout North America to keep the family afloat. Despite her monetary difficulties, Busch passed over her when casting Despina for the New Opera Company in 1941, leading to a breakdown in the warm relationship between Busch and the Christies. She made her final operatic appearance in May 1943 in Montreal, singing the role of Susanna under the direction of Sir Thomas Beecham. Tired, worn out and homesick, Mildmay and the family returned to the UK in May 1944.

== Return to the United Kingdom ==
After the war, Glyndebourne formed a professional children's theatre to produce plays for children. The project was dear to Mildmay's heart, and she and her husband sat on the Council. Mildmay also became involved with the Lewes Music Festival. She was on the Music Panel of the Arts Council from 1947 to 1951.

Inspired by her wartime remark and with the support and help of Mildmay and Glyndebourne, Bing established the Edinburgh International Festival in 1947. Glyndebourne presented two operas for the festivals, but Mildmay was not able to perform due to ill-health.

Mildmay was ill throughout the 1952 Glyndebourne season. She was not able to chaperone her daughter during her coming out season as debutante. She had surgery twice to alleviate her high blood pressure and to preserve her vision. However, the relief from illness proved only temporary and she died at Glyndebourne on 31 May 1953. As she had requested – and typical of her concern for the enjoyment and welfare of others – the 1953 Glyndebourne season opened as planned a week later.
