= Nancy Carroll (British actress) =

British actress (born 1973)

- Born: 30 September 1973 (age 53)
- Education: London Academy of Music and Dramatic Art
- Occupation: Actress
- Years active: 1998–present
- Height: 5 ft 5 in (165 cm)
- Spouse: Jo Stone-Fewings (m. 2003)
- Children: 2

Nancy Carroll (born 30 September 1973) is a British actress. She has worked extensively in theatre productions, particularly with the Royal Shakespeare Company and has won Best Actress at the Olivier Awards and the Evening Standard Awards. She also has numerous film and television credits, including a long-running featured role as Lady Felicia in the BBC series Father Brown.

== Early life and education ==
Nancy Carroll grew up in Herne Hill in south London and attended Alleyn's School where she was an enthusiastic participant in student theatre. Before training in theatre, she worked at a hat shop in Lavender Hill. She trained at the London Academy of Music and Dramatic Art, from which she graduated in June 1998.

== Career ==
Right after graduation, she landed a small part in the film An Ideal Husband and then joined the Royal Shakespeare Company (RSC). Her first professional stage role was as Ophelia in Hamlet at the Bristol Old Vic in 1999. She has appeared onstage in productions of George Etherege's The Man of Mode (2007), Harley Granville-Barker's The Voysey Inheritance (2006), as Emma Jung in The Talking Cure, and Pierre de Marivaux's The False Servant (2004) at the Royal National Theatre. She has also appeared at the Almeida Theatre in Jonathan Kent's King Lear (also at The Old Vic) and in another Granville-Barker play, Waste (2008).

Her "Lady Croom" in the 2009 London revival of Stoppard's Arcadia received favourable reviews, as did her successful run as the psychologist Dr. Ford in David Mamet's House of Games at the Almeida Theatre.

She has appeared onstage with her husband Jo Stone-Fewings several times, in See How They Run (2006) and in the Noël Coward double bill at the Liverpool Playhouse in March 2004 (The Astonished Heart and Still Life). In 2009, she appeared as Viola opposite her husband's Orsino in an RSC production of Twelfth Night directed by Gregory Doran.

Carroll appeared alongside Benedict Cumberbatch and Adrian Scarborough in Thea Sharrock's revival of Terence Rattigan's play, After the Dance, at the Royal National Theatre in 2010. Her "heartbreaking performance" won her the Best Actress award in the Evening Standard drama awards and Olivier awards for 2010.

Carroll appeared alongside John Lithgow, Joshua McGuire, and Nicholas Burns in Arthur Wing Pinero's Victorian farce The Magistrate at the Royal National Theatre in 2012. In 2013 she played the lead role of Felicity Houston in The Duck House by Dan Patterson and Colin Swash, starring alongside Ben Miller and Diana Vickers. The show was a political satire based on the UK parliamentary expenses scandal and toured for 5 weeks before transferring to London's Vaudeville Theatre.

On television, she played the part of aristocratic Nazi sympathiser Frances Doble in the BBC2 miniseries Cambridge Spies (2003). Other credits include guest appearances on The Suspicions of Mr Whicher, Silent Witness, Lewis, and episodes of Midsomer Murders. From 2013, she was a regular cast member on the BBC detective series Father Brown playing wealthy socialite Lady Felicia Montague. In 2017 she was in four episodes of Prime Suspect 1973 playing Mary Collins.

In March 2022, Carroll debuted in the lead role of Marine Bonnet in Murder in Provence, a BritBox cosy crime drama based on the Verlaque and Bonnet detective novels by M. L. Longworth, alongside Endeavour actor Roger Allam as her romantic partner, Antoine Verlaque.

== Personal life ==
She is married to actor Jo Stone-Fewings; the couple have two children.

== Acting credits ==
=== Film ===
- An Ideal Husband (1999)
- Iris (2001)
- F1: The Movie (2025)
- Clayface (2026)

=== Television ===
- The Gathering Storm (2002) as Diana Churchill
- Cambridge Spies (2003) as Frances Dobie
- Holby City (1 episode, 2003) as Elaine Gill
- Midsomer Murders (2 episodes) as Antonia Wilmot in "Hidden Depths" (2005) and as Connie Bishop in "The Great and the Good" (2010)
- Dalziel and Pascoe (2007) as Samantha Mantell
- Inspector Lewis (2012, series 6, episode 4) as Anne Rand
- Silent Witness (2 episodes, 2012) as Gill Bailey
- Father Brown (2013–2023) as Lady Felicia Montague
- The Suspicions of Mr Whicher (2014) as Charlotte Piper
- Will (2017) as Ellen Burbage
- Queens of Mystery (2019) as Isabella Wolfe in "Murder in the Dark", chapters 1 and 2
- The Crown (2019–2020) as Lady Anne Glenconner (third and fourth seasons)
- Agatha Raisin (2020) as Fiona Richards in the episode "As The Pig Turns"
- Murder in Provence (2022) as Marine Bonnet
- The Diplomat (2024) as Philippa Pemberton
- The Room in the Tower (2025) as Verity

=== Stage ===
Appearances include:

- For the Royal Shakespeare Company:
  - Henry IV, as Lady Percy, directed by Michael Attenborough
  - As You Like It, directed by Greg Doran
  - The Winter's Tale, directed by Greg Doran
  - Twelfth Night, directed by Greg Doran
  - The Lion, the Witch and the Wardrobe, directed by Adrian Noble
- For the Royal National Theatre:
  - The Magistrate, directed by Timothy Sheader
  - After The Dance, directed by Thea Sharrock
  - Manor, written and directed by Fiona Buffini
- For the Donmar Warehouse:
  - The Recruiting Officer, directed by Josie Rourke
  - Closer, directed by David Leveaux
- The Duck House at the Vaudeville Theatre
- You Never Can Tell at the Garrick Theatre
- Mammals at the Bush Theatre
- A Midsummer Night's Dream, directed by Michael Grandage at the Sheffield Crucible
- The Lady's Not for Burning, directed by Samuel West at the Chichester Festival Theatre
- The Moderate Soprano at the Hampstead Theatre
- Woyzeck, directed by Joe Murphy at The Old Vic
