= Glyndebourne Festival Opera =

English opera festival

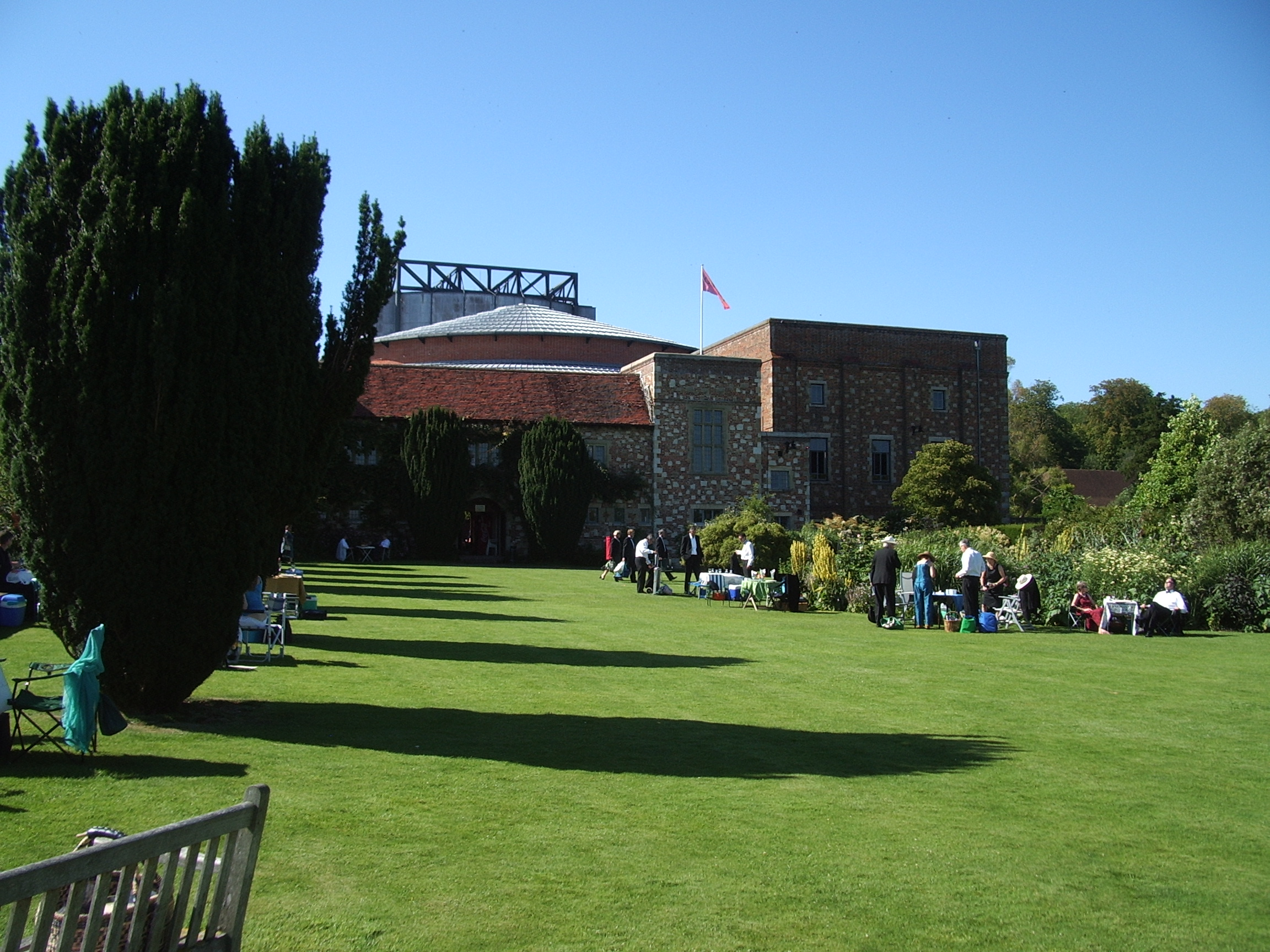
- The new theatre, 31 July 2007
- Genre: Opera
- Dates: 1934–present
- Locations: Glyndebourne, East Sussex, England
- Coordinates: 50°52′42″N 0°03′50″E
- Founders: John Christie
- Website: glyndebourne.com

Glyndebourne Festival Opera is an annual opera festival held at Glyndebourne, an English country house near Lewes, in East Sussex, England.

== History ==
Under the supervision of the Christie family, the festival has been held annually since 1934, except in 1941–45 during World War II and 1993 when the theatre was being rebuilt, for a 1994 reopening. Gus Christie, son of Sir George Christie and grandson of festival founder John Christie, became festival chairman in 2000.

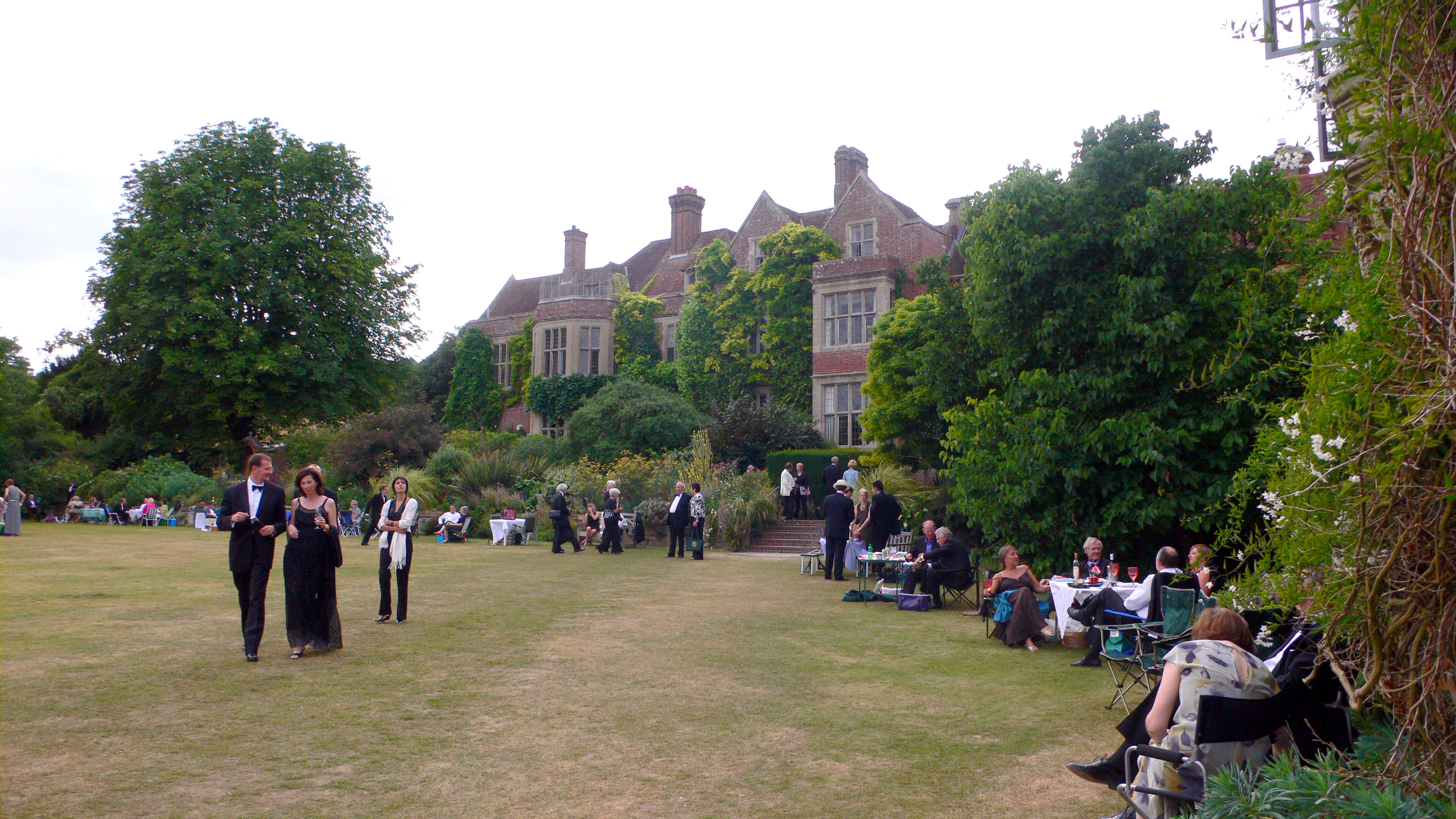
Glyndebourne House, 1 August 2006

Since the company's inception, Glyndebourne has been particularly celebrated for its productions of Mozart operas. Recordings of Glyndebourne's past historic Mozart productions have been reissued. Other notable productions included their 1980s production of George Gershwin's Porgy and Bess, directed by Trevor Nunn, and later expanded from the Glyndebourne stage and videotaped in 1993 for television, with Nunn again directing. While Mozart operas have continued to be the mainstay of its repertory, the company has expanded it with productions of Janáček and Handel operas.

Glyndebourne has two resident orchestras – the London Philharmonic Orchestra (since 1964) and the Orchestra of the Age of Enlightenment. In January 2014, Robin Ticciati became the seventh music director of the company.

Past general directors of the festival have included David Pickard. In November 2015, the festival announced the appointment of Sebastian F. Schwarz as its general director, effective in May 2016. In March 2018 Schwarz stepped down as general director. In August 2018, the festival announced the appointment of Stephen Langridge as its next artistic director, effective in the spring of 2019.

The festival operates without subsidy. Its first placement of advertisements was in 2003. The festival has planned to incorporate power by wind turbine, as part of its "green" initiatives.

Many Glyndebourne attendees come from London, and the event is regarded as part of the English summer season. Performances start in the afternoon, enabling Londoners to leave town after lunch, and finish in time for them to catch the last train back. A long interval allows opera-goers the opportunity for picnic dinners on the extensive lawns or in one of the restaurants in the grounds. Annually in London, the company presents an opera performance at The Proms.

== Music directors ==
- Fritz Busch (1934–1951)
- Vittorio Gui (1952–1963)
- John Pritchard (1964–1977)
- Bernard Haitink (1978–1988)
- Andrew Davis (1989–2000)
- Vladimir Jurowski (2001–2013)
- Robin Ticciati (2014–present)

== Glyndebourne on Tour ==
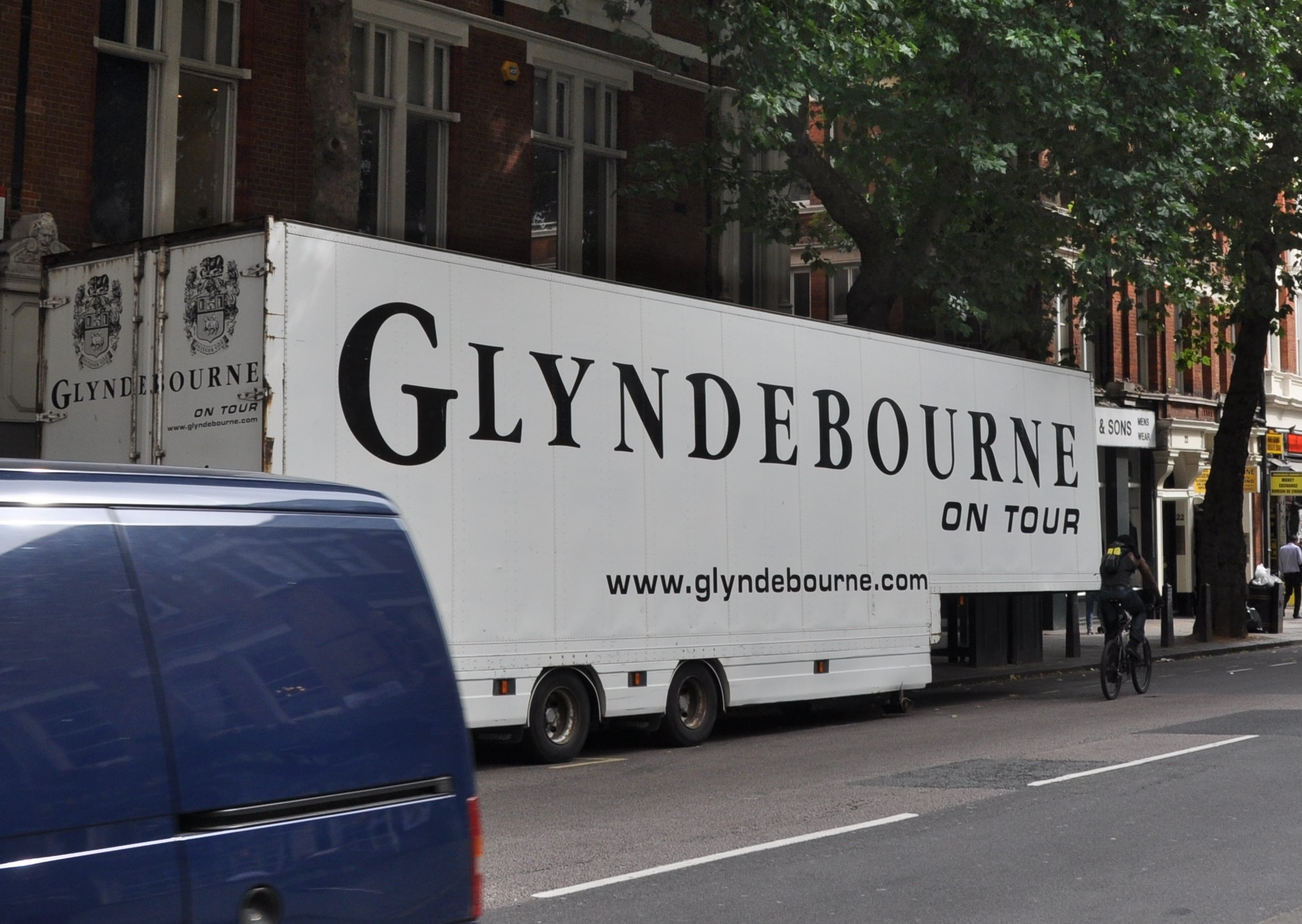
The Glyndebourne on Tour trailer

In 1968, Glyndebourne Festival Opera established a touring ensemble, Glyndebourne Touring Opera, which in its first season took opera productions to Newcastle, Liverpool, Manchester, Sheffield and Oxford. In addition to bringing the work of Glyndebourne Festival Opera to audiences some distance from Glyndebourne, Glyndebourne Touring Opera offers opportunities for younger opera singers to develop their craft. In 2003, the Glyndebourne Touring Opera administrative duties were absorbed back into the main Glyndebourne Festival Opera administration, and the touring company was renamed Glyndebourne on Tour. The touring company now has the name of Glyndebourne Tour. Unlike Glyndebourne Festival Opera, Glyndebourne Tour does receive some subsidy, from the Arts Council England.

As of 2022, the Tour performed in the Milton Keynes Theatre, the Marlowe Theatre in Canterbury, the Theatre Royal in Norwich and the Liverpool Empire Theatre.

The tour normally takes place in autumn following the festival season, and typically includes three weeks of performances at Glyndebourne, followed by one week in each of the other locations. The touring ensemble has separate music directors, as follows:

- Myer Fredman (1968–1974)
- Kenneth Montgomery (1975–1976)
- Nicholas Braithwaite (1977–1980)
- Jane Glover (1982–1985)
- Graeme Jenkins (1986–1991)
- Ivor Bolton (1992–1997)
- Louis Langrée (1998–2003)
- Edward Gardner (2004–2007)
- Robin Ticciati (2007–2009)
- Jakub Hrůša (2010–2012)
- Ben Glassberg (2019–2021, principal conductor)

Ticciati is the first former music director of Glyndebourne on Tour to be named music director of the full Glyndebourne Festival Opera company.

Glyndebourne Festival Opera has also toured internationally, including the Adelaide Festival in 2006 with its production of Flight by Jonathan Dove and April De Angelis.

In January 2023, the company announced that the planned 2023 Glyndebourne on Tour season will not occur, as a result of the reduced funding from Arts Council England for the 2023–2026 National Portfolio. In December 2023, the company announced the appointment of Adam Hickox as the new principal conductor of Glyndebourne Sinfonia, the new name for the Glyndebourne on Tour Orchestra, with immediate effect.

== Finances ==
Glyndebourne is constituted as a registered charity called Glyndebourne Productions Limited, which is a company limited by guarantee. It has a wholly owned subsidiary, Glyndebourne Enterprises Limited, which carries out merchandising, production hire and media development activities, and donates its profits to the charity. A related charity called the Glyndebourne Arts Trust carries out fund-raising activities. Glyndebourne Association America allows residents of the United States to make tax efficient donations to Glyndebourne.

Glyndebourne has an annual budget of a little over £20 million, as of 2010. The Festival is the only major opera season in the United Kingdom which is not state subsidised. Glyndebourne on Tour receives an annual subsidy of around £1.5 million from Arts Council England, but is budgeted to make an annual loss even after this has been credited. The shortfall is covered by an internal cross subsidy.

== Other media ==
The Glyndebourne Label was established in 2008 to release live recordings on CD. Commercial releases have included Mozart's Idomeneo (with Luciano Pavarotti and Gundula Janowitz), Dvořák's Rusalka and Benjamin Britten's Billy Budd. During the music directorship of Vladimir Jurowski, the festival began its "Glyndebourne on Screen" programme, for viewers to see performances from the festival in cinemas and live-streaming on personal computers, the latter in partnership with The Guardian newspaper.

== See also ==
- Country house opera
- Glyndebourne Festival Opera: history and repertoire, 1934–51
- Glyndebourne Festival Opera: history and repertoire, 1952–63
- List of music festivals in the United Kingdom
