= The Pope's Exorcist =

2023 film by Julius Avery

- Theatrical release poster
- Directed by: Julius Avery
- Screenplay by: Michael Petroni; Evan Spiliotopoulos
- Story by: R. Dean McCreary; Chester Hastings; Jeff Katz
- Based on: An Exorcist Tells His Story and An Exorcist: More Stories by Father Gabriele Amorth
- Produced by: Doug Belgrad; Michael Patrick Kaczmarek; Jeff Katz
- Starring: Russell Crowe; Daniel Zovatto; Alex Essoe; Franco Nero
- Cinematography: Khalid Mohtaseb
- Edited by: Matt Evans
- Music by: Jed Kurzel
- Production companies: Screen Gems; 2.0 Entertainment; Loyola Productions
- Distributed by: Sony Pictures Releasing
- Release dates: April 5, 2023 (International); April 14, 2023 (United States)
- Running time: 103 minutes
- Countries: United States; United Kingdom; Spain
- Language: English
- Budget: $18 million
- Box office: $77 million

The Pope's Exorcist is a 2023 supernatural horror film directed by Julius Avery from a screenplay by Michael Petroni and Evan Spiliotopoulos, based on the 1990 book An Exorcist Tells His Story and the 1992 book An Exorcist: More Stories by Father Gabriele Amorth. The film stars Russell Crowe as Amorth, with Daniel Zovatto, Alex Essoe, and Franco Nero in supporting roles.

Production began in 2020 when Screen Gems purchased the rights to Amorth's story. After a directorial replacement and script revisions, filming occurred in Ireland from August to October 2022.

The Pope's Exorcist was released in several countries beginning on April 5, 2023, and in the United States on April 14. The film received mixed reviews from critics and grossed $77 million worldwide.

== Plot ==
In 1987, Father Gabriele Amorth, a World War II Italian partisan and the Pope's personal exorcist, an earthy, scooter-riding and practical man with a sense of humour, visits an Italian village where a teenage boy, Enzo, appears possessed by a demon. With the local priest, Amorth enters the room where Enzo is restrained. During the exorcism, he uses a Saint Benedict Medal sacramental and taunts the demon, challenging it to possess a pig. When it does, the pig is killed with a shotgun.

The incident brings Amorth before a Church tribunal headed by Cardinal Sullivan, who doubts the existence of the Devil, and attended by Amorth's friend Bishop Lumumba. Amorth insists that evil exists, but says he did not perform a genuine exorcism, only psychological theatrics to help the mentally ill man. Disgusted by Sullivan's lack of faith, he leaves.

Julia Vasquez, her young son Henry and his teenage sister Amy travel from the United States to visit an old Spanish abbey, which was Julia's husband's sole legacy to the family after his death in a car accident witnessed by Henry. Traumatised, Henry has not spoken since the accident. After a sinister fire injures workers restoring the abbey for sale, they abandon the project. Henry begins behaving strangely, but medical tests find no physical abnormality.

Henry appears possessed and demands a priest. Father Tomas Esquibel, a local priest, arrives, but Henry obscenely mocks him. The Pope sends Amorth to investigate. At the abbey, Henry taunts Amorth with memories of World War II. Amorth stresses the importance of prayer, while Esquibel struggles as an assistant exorcist, at one point attempting to strangle Henry after being provoked and mocked over his sins.

Their attempts to exorcise Henry fail, and the demon intermittently possesses Amy. Amorth learns that Julia has rejected religion since childhood, but persuades her to pray after she reveals that she once believed her guardian angel protected her.

The Pope falls seriously ill while reading historical documents about the abbey and is hospitalised. Amorth discovers a well leading to a complex sealed by the Church as demonically dangerous. There he learns that a founder of the Spanish Inquisition, himself an exorcist, was possessed and left to die in a buried cage. The Church concealed the incident. Amorth eventually discovers that Henry's demon is Asmodeus, whose name will aid the exorcism.

Amorth and Esquibel undergo the sacrament of Confession and Absolution, confessing and absolving one another. Amorth admits that, after surviving the war and vowing to serve God in gratitude, he failed to help a mentally ill woman who subsequently died by suicide, his pride preventing him from intervening. Esquibel confesses that he fornicated with a young woman whom he did not marry. They prepare for the final exorcism, with Amorth instructing Esquibel to wear a Miraculous Medal necklace.

The exorcism succeeds only when Amorth offers himself as a host, fulfilling Asmodeus's desire to destroy him. Amorth attempts to hang himself, but Asmodeus stops him, intending instead to use him to infiltrate and destroy the Church. Esquibel helps Amorth resist, while the two banish Asmodeus and demonic manifestations resembling the women associated with their past sins back to Hell.

The Pope and Henry recover, and the Vatican purchases and reconsecrates the abbey. Amorth and Esquibel return to Rome, where they learn that Sullivan has taken leave in Guam and Lumumba has replaced him. They are admitted to a special Church archive, where Lumumba reveals that, using a map Amorth found at the abbey, they will investigate 199 other sites associated with evil and combat the Devil. Amorth jokes that he and Esquibel are going to Hell.

== Cast ==
- Russell Crowe as Father Gabriele Amorth
- Daniel Zovatto as Father Esquibel
- Alex Essoe as Julia Vasquez
- Franco Nero as the Pope
- River Hawkins as Enzo
- Peter DeSouza-Feighoney as Henry Vasquez
- Laurel Marsden as Amy Vasquez
- Cornell John as Bishop Lumumba
- Ryan O'Grady as Cardinal Sullivan
- Carrie Munroe as Adella
- Bianca Bardoe as Rosaria
- Ralph Ineson as the voice of Asmodeus

== Production ==
=== Development ===
In October 2020, Screen Gems acquired the rights to the story of Father Gabriele Amorth with Ángel Gómez hired to direct. Chester Hastings and R. Dean McCreary were attached to write the script, while Michael Patrick Kaczmarek, Jeff Katz, and Edward "Eddie" Siebert were set to produce the film. In June 2022, Julius Avery boarded the film as director along with producer Doug Belgrad of 2.0 Entertainment. Subsequent script revisions were provided by Michael Petroni, Evan Spiliotopoulos, and Chuck MacLean.

=== Casting ===
In June 2022, Russell Crowe was cast as Amorth. The following month, Alex Essoe and Daniel Zovatto joined the cast. In September, Franco Nero was cast as the Pope, while Laurel Marsden, Cornell S. John, and Peter DeSouza-Feighoney were added to the cast. Ralph Ineson voices the demon.

=== Filming ===
Principal photography took place from August to October 2022 in Dublin and Limerick, Ireland and Rome, Italy. Scenes were also filmed with Crowe in Trinity College in Dublin.

== Release ==
The Pope's Exorcist was released in India on April 7, 2023. It was released in the United States on April 14, 2023, by Sony Pictures Releasing.

=== Home media ===
The film was released on digital formats on May 2, followed by a Blu-ray and DVD release on June 13. The film was later streamed on Netflix starting August 16, 2023, where it ranked as the number one film in America for nine straight days.

== Reception ==
=== Box office ===
The Pope's Exorcist grossed $20 million in the United States and Canada, and $57 million in other territories, for a worldwide total of $77 million.

In the United States and Canada, The Pope's Exorcist was released alongside Renfield, Mafia Mamma, Sweetwater, and Suzume, and was projected to gross between $4–10 million from 3,178 theaters in its opening weekend. The film made $3.5 million on its first day, including $850,000 from Thursday night previews. It went on to debut to $9.2 million, finishing second behind holdover The Super Mario Bros. Movie. The film made $3.3 million in its sophomore weekend (dropping 63%), finishing in seventh.

In other territories, the film was released a week ahead of its U.S. debut, grossing $12 million from 43 markets. In its second weekend, the film expanded to 51 markets, earning $10.4 million. The Pope's Exorcist grossed $5.7 million from 53 markets in its third weekend.

=== Critical response ===
On the review aggregator website Rotten Tomatoes, 51% of 106 critics' reviews are positive, with an average rating of 5.1/10. The website's consensus reads: "Dominus Crowe! The Pope's Exorcist is standard-issue holy horror in most respects, but its star's sanctified performance will be the answer to some viewers' prayers." Metacritic, which uses a weighted average, assigned the film a score of 45 out of 100, based on 19 critics, indicating "mixed or average" reviews. Audiences surveyed by CinemaScore gave the film an average grade of "B-" on an A+ to F scale, while those polled by PostTrak gave the film a 79% positive score.

Tamlin Magee at The Guardian noted, "Most professions are flattered by the attentions of Hollywood. Yet a body representing the real-life practitioners depicted in new Russell Crowe horror The Pope's Exorcist have condemned the film as 'unreliable … splatter cinema'. ... In a statement issued last month, the International Association of Exorcists (IAE) called the title of the film 'pretentious' and claimed that its Da Vinci Code-esque conspiratorial plot poses 'unacceptable doubt' to the public as to who 'the real enemy is, the devil or ecclesiastical power'."

Paul Asay at Plugged In, a Christian film review publication, praised the film for its themes of sacrifice and extolling the virtue of love; he wrote that The Pope's Exorcist "may actually plant seeds of spiritual growth in the lives of some".

Crowe's performance has received mixed reviews from critics. Chris Vognar of Rolling Stone positively reviewed his performance, writing that "Crowe brings an imposing physicality and winking charm to go with Amorth's gravity." Kayleena Pierce-Bohen of Screen Rant was similarly positive, writing that "even if he's in something subpar, his screen presence is undeniable." However, several reviewers, including Pierce-Bohen and Luke Thompson of A.V. Club, criticized Crowe's Italian accent.

=== Accolades ===
| Award / Film Festival | Date of ceremony | Category | Recipient(s) | Result | Ref. |
|---|---|---|---|---|---|
| Golden Raspberry Awards | March 9, 2024 | Worst Actor | Russell Crowe | Nominated | |
| Golden Raspberry Awards | March 9, 2024 | Worst Supporting Actor | Franco Nero | Nominated | |
| Irish Film & Television Awards | 20 April 2024 | Best Costume Design | Lorna Marie Mugan | Nominated | |
| Irish Film & Television Awards | 20 April 2024 | Best Hair & Make-Up | Orla Carroll and Lynn Johnston | Won | |

== Possible sequel ==
In April 2023, a sequel was announced to be in early development. Crowe is expected to reprise his role.

In May 2024, The Pope's Exorcist 2 was greenlit but no cast have yet confirmed their return.

== See also ==
- The Devil and Father Amorth, 2017 documentary
- Exorcism in Christianity
- Exorcism in the Catholic Church
- The Exorcism
