= Giancarlo Gramolazzo =

Italian Roman Catholic priest and exorcist (1945–2010)

The Reverend Fr. Giancarlo Gramolazzo
- Exorcist
- Church: Roman Catholic Church
- Other post: Priest

Orders
- Ordination: 1973
- Consecration: Saint Luigi Orione
- Rank: Priest

Personal details
- Born: 1945 North Italy, Italy
- Died: 8 November 2010 (aged 64–65) Rome, Italy
- Denomination: Roman Catholic
- Occupation: Priest
- Profession: Priest; Exorcist

Father Giancarlo Gramolazzo (Ortonovo, Italy, 1945 – Rome, 8 November 2010) was an Italian Roman Catholic priest who served as an exorcist. He was the president of the International Association of Exorcists until his death.

Born in the north of Italy, he joined the order of Saint Luigi Orione at the age of 12, where he was ordered as a priest in 1973, to become president of the Institute of orphans of Roma-Montemario.

He was dedicated during 30 years to exorcism, becoming president of the International Association of Exorcists, founded in 1990 by father Gabriele Amorth (1925–2016), who later remained its honourable president and 5 other priests. Father Gramolazzo has over thirty years experience as an exorcist. He helped Father Gabriele Amorth in a 1999 exorcism of a nineteen years old woman. The next day the same woman who appeared at the Vatican underwent another exorcism performed by Pope John Paul II.

In September 2004, in Mexico City, Mexico, Father Gramolazzo addressed more than five hundred participants including exorcist priests from various dioceses in the country at the annual meeting of the International Association of Exorcists.

He died in Rome at the age of 65, after a serious disease, as Radio Vatican informed on 12 November 2010. The funeral was officed in the Roman church of All Saints, presided by bishop Giovanni D'Ercole and concelebrated by 60 priests, with the presence of family members, exorcists and representatives of the Association Family of the Immaculate, founded by himself.
