= Exorcism in the Catholic Church =

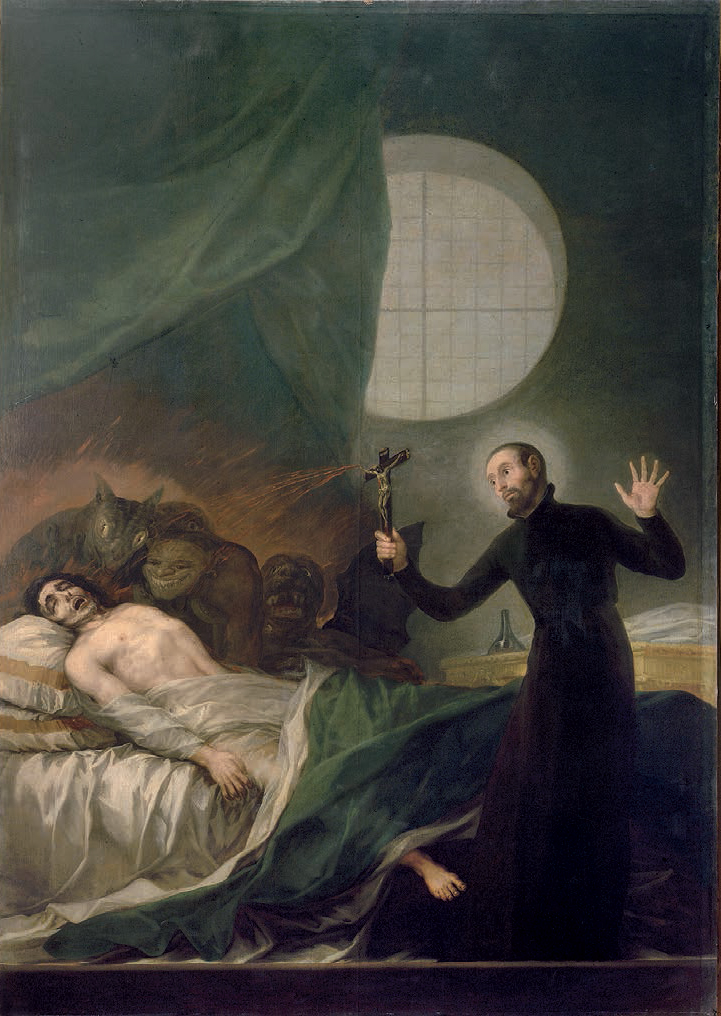
Painting in the Valencia Cathedral by Francisco de Goya of Saint Francis Borgia performing an exorcism

The Catholic Church authorizes the use of exorcism for Christians who are believed to be the victims of demonic possession. In Catholicism, exorcism is sacramental but not a sacrament, unlike baptism or confession. Unlike a sacrament, exorcism's "integrity and efficacy do not depend [...] on the rigid use of an unchanging formula or on the ordered sequence of prescribed actions. Its efficacy depends on two elements: authorization from valid and licit Church authorities, and the faith of the exorcist." The Catechism of the Catholic Church states: "When the Church asks publicly and authoritatively in the name of Jesus Christ that a person or object be protected against the power of the Evil One and withdrawn from his dominion, it is called exorcism."

Initial guidelines, such as the manual of exorcism Of Exorcisms and Certain Supplications (Latin: De Exorcismis et Supplicationibus Quibusdam), were issued in 1614. The Catholic Church revised the Rite of Exorcism in January 1999. The traditional Rite of Exorcism in Ecclesiastical Latin remains as an option. Solemn exorcisms, according to the Canon law of the Church, can be exercised only by an ordained priest (or higher prelate), with the express permission of the local bishop, and only after a careful medical examination to exclude the possibility of mental illness and personality disorders.

The Catholic Encyclopedia (1908) enjoined: "Superstition ought not to be confounded with religion, however much their history may be interwoven, nor magic, however white it may be, with a legitimate religious rite." Things listed in the Roman Ritual (Latin: Rituale Romanum) as being indicators of possible demonic possession include: speaking foreign or ancient languages of which the possessed has no prior knowledge; supernatural abilities and strength; knowledge of hidden or remote things which the possessed has no way of knowing; an aversion to anything holy; and profuse blasphemy or sacrilege.

== Evaluation ==
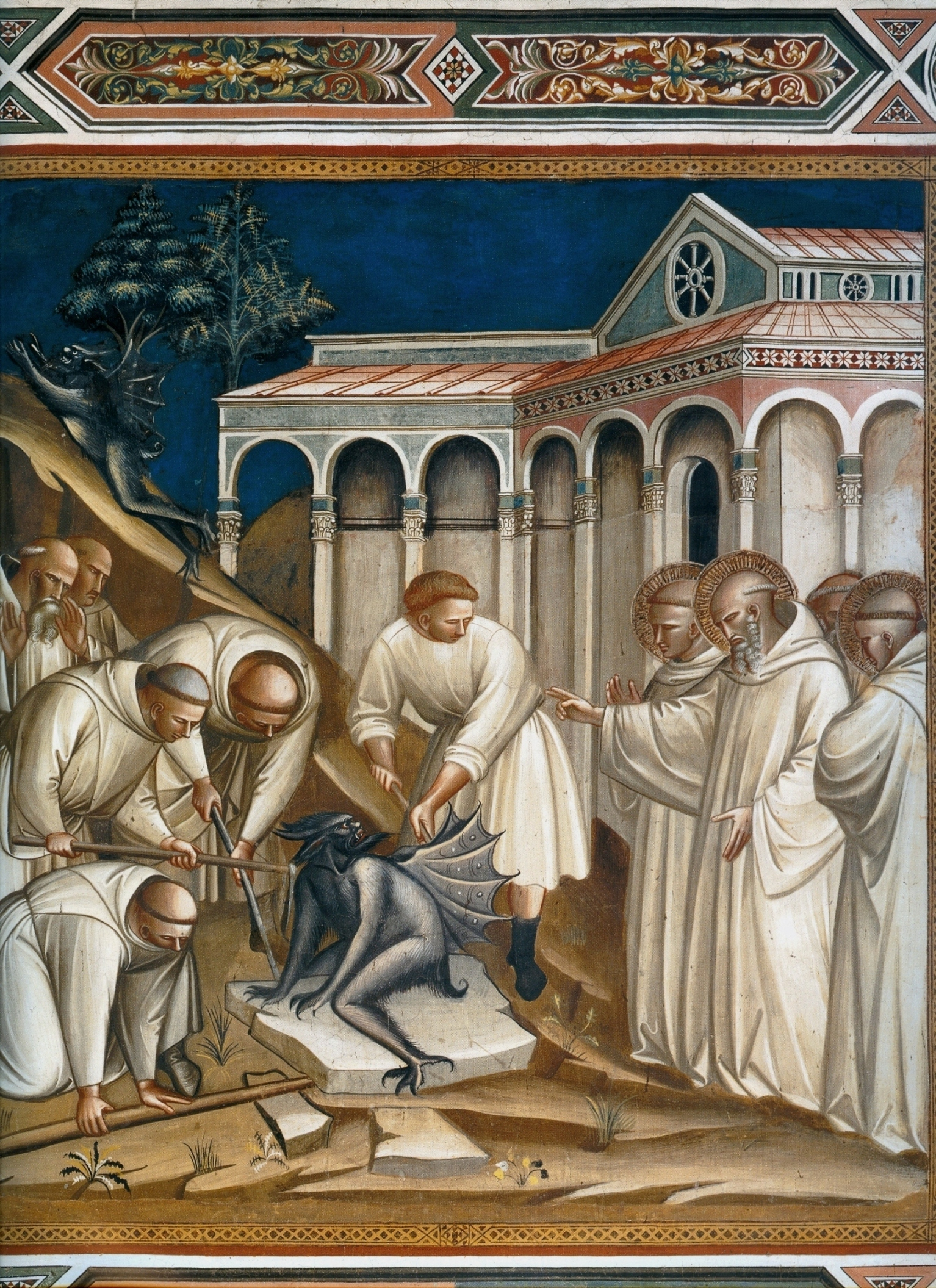
Exorcism of St Benedict by Spinello Aretino, 1387

According to the Vatican's guidelines issued in 1999, "the person who claims to be possessed must be evaluated by doctors to rule out a mental or physical illness". Most reported cases are not seen as requiring an exorcism because twentieth-century Catholic officials regarded genuine demonic possession as an extremely rare phenomenon that is easily confused with mental illness. Demand for exorcisms increased in the early twenty-first century and the number of trained exorcists increased. Prior to the late twentieth century, exorcists were mainly anonymous, and the performance of exorcisms remained a secret. Some exorcists attributed the rise in demand of exorcisms to a rise in drug abuse and violence, leading to the suggestion that the two were related. The Church point of view is that some people need only spiritual or medical help, especially if drugs or other addictions are present, and not exorcism. The Church view is that trained priest and medical professionals can work together to help a patient, and to be able to determine if the patient is suffering from an illness or not. Spiritual needs are dealt with by prayers, the laying on of hands or a counselling session. Particular sacramentals, such as the wearing of a cross necklace or usage of blessed salt, are believed by the Church to offer protection against Satan when used with faith.

=== Characteristics ===
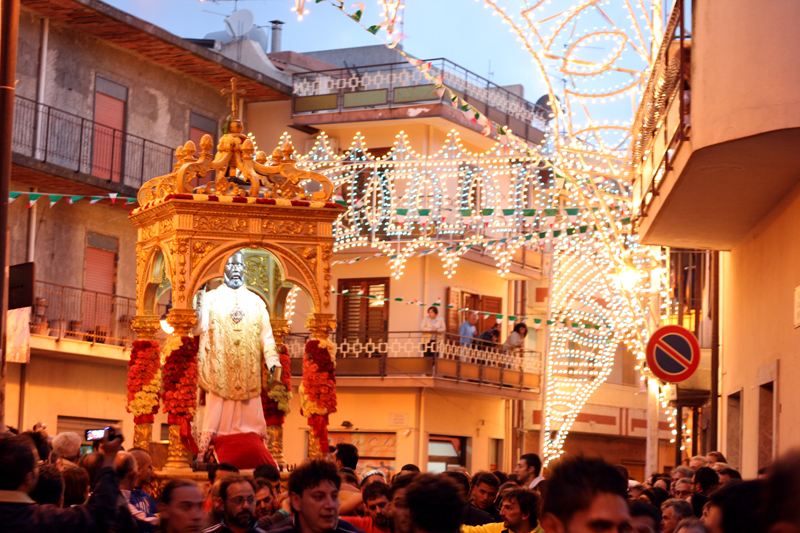
Saint Philip of Agira with the Gospel in his left hand, the symbol of the exorcists, in the May celebrations in his honor at Limina, Sicily

What the Church views as signs of demonic invasion vary depending on the type of demon and its purpose, including:

- Using languages unknown to the person or people around them.
- Having extraordinary strength or resistance to physical restraint.
- Knowledge of events or people that the person could not have possibly known.
- An aversion to holy objects or places, such as holy water or churches.
- Self-harming and displaying violent or aggressive behaviour.
- Ailments or conditions that cannot be diagnosed or treated medically.
- Having hallucinations or hearing voices.
- An abrupt change in behaviour or personality.
- Sudden spiritual dryness.
- Expelling of objects or animals through the mouth.

== Procedure ==
The person subjected to exorcism may be restrained so that, in the view of the Church, they do not harm themselves or any person present. The exorcist then prays and commands the demons possessing the subject to retreat. The Catholic priest recites certain prayers – the Lord's Prayer, Hail Mary, and the Athanasian Creed. Exorcists use a cross and holy water and follow procedures listed in the Roman Ritual of the exorcism revised by the Vatican in 1999. Seasoned exorcists use the Rituale Romanum as a starting point, not always following the prescribed formula exactly. The official practice of exorcism is now governed by the 1999 Vatican document De Exorcismis et Supplicationibus Quibusdam. The Vatican offers a course on exorcism, which in 2019 for the first time was opened to members of other Christian denominations. According to Brad Steiger, after the exorcism has been finished, the person possessed feels a "kind of release of guilt and feels reborn and freed of sin."

Samuel J. Aquila views the recital of the Lord's Prayer as a small-scale exorcism procedure, as the ending contains the words "deliver us from evil". In the 15th century, Catholic exorcists were both priestly and lay, since every Christian was considered as having the power to command demons and drive them out in the name of Christ. These exorcists used the Order of Saint Benedict's formula "Vade retro satana" ("Step back, Satan") around this time (this prayer is inscribed on the Saint Benedict Medal sacramental).

Benedictio domus a dæmone vexatæ is used to exorcise a haunted house.

== Prevalence ==
Demand for exorcisms was globally rising in 2018. This increase was described as a "pastoral emergency" by the International Association of Exorcists. According to Dr Richard Gallagher, a psychiatrist who works with exorcists, the rise is caused by both an increase of people believing they are possessed when they are not and a trend away from mainstream religions towards the occult. Professor of religious studies, Andrew Chesnut, sees the rise being caused by a rise in charismatic Christianity. Chesnut says that a disproportionate number of exorcists belong to the Catholic Charismatic Renewal movement. According to exorcist Fr Vincent Lampert, about 1 in 5000 people who believe they are possessed, are indeed.

== Literature ==
=== Father Amorth ===
An Exorcist Tells His Story (published on March 1, 1999), An Exorcist: More Stories (published on February 1, 2002), An Exorcist Explains the Demonic: The Antics of Satan and His Army of Fallen Angels (published on October 20, 2016), Father Amorth: My Battle Against Satan (published on November 15, 2018) and The Devil is Afraid of Me: The Life and Work of the World's Most Popular Exorcist (published on January 19, 2020) were some of the books written by Father Gabriele Amorth, chief exorcist of the Vatican from 1986 until his death in 2016 (aged 91) which describes his experiences as an exorcist, which inspired the 2023 film The Pope's Exorcist.

=== Mainstream literature ===
Journalist Matt Baglio wrote The Rite: The Making of a Modern Exorcist, first edited in 2009 and then in 2010, which inspired the 2011 film The Rite and which mentions Psychiatrist Dr. Richard E. Gallagher, who has also written a book on the subject, published in 2020 by HarperCollins, called Demonic Foes, A Psychiatrist Investigates Demonic Possession in the Modern United States.

== By country ==
=== Germany ===
One prominent example of a German exorcism is the 1976 death of Anneliese Michel, for which two priests were convicted of negligent homicide.

=== Poland ===
In 2008, the Catholic Church approved plans to establish an exorcism centre in Poczernin. In 2018, Poland had 150 exorcists. Their role was seen as fighting the "demons of homosexuality" and the "demons of esotericism."

Piotr Glas is a Polish exorcist. As of December 2017, according to a Polish Church official from Płock, Glas was disqualified from exorcism and from using techniques that are forbidden under the Church's rules of exorcism. Other Polish Church officials stated in 2017 that their informal opinion was that Glas was "not an exorcist" as he was affiliated with the Diocese of Portsmouth, not with a Polish diocese.

=== Mexico ===
In 2004, Cardinal Norberto Rivera Carrera, the archbishop of Mexico City, held the first National Meeting of Exorcists with the intention of combating Satanism. In 2013, exorcists in Mexico City said that there was "unprecedented demand for their services." One exorcist attributed the rise in need for exorcisms to the rise in the number of followers of Santa Muerte and the decriminalization of abortion.

== Notable examples ==
- A book written by Father Gabriel Amorth, chief exorcist of the Vatican from 1986 until he died in 2016 (aged 91), describes his experiences as an exorcist. The film The Pope's Exorcist was inspired by Amorth's works.
- 1928 – Emma Schmidt (pseudonym Anna Ecklund) underwent a 14-day exorcism in Earling, Iowa, performed by a Catholic priest. This is the most well-documented case of alleged demonic possession in history and a minor inspiration for The Exorcist. The priest who led this exorcism was Fr. Theophilus Riesinger.
- 1949 – Roland Doe was allegedly possessed and underwent an exorcism. The events later inspired the novel and film The Exorcist.
- 1975–1976 – Anneliese Michel was a woman from Germany who underwent 67 exorcisms, which inspired the films The Exorcism of Emily Rose and Requiem. In a conference several years later, German bishops retracted the claim that she had been possessed.
- 1979 – Reports of an exorcism in the Catholic village of Zhangpuqiapo, near the pilgrimage site of Sheshan, resulted in tensions between the Catholic Church in China and the government. According to the accounts, a woman was demonically possessed and a married priest who was a member of the Chinese Catholic Patriotic Association failed to exorcise it using the older Latin formulas for expelling demons. Attempts by villagers to take the woman to Sheshan failed (attributed to the woman's supernatural strength) and initial attempts by three women Catholic teachers said to be proficient in expelling demons failed. An account of the exorcism describes one of the women returning with the Eucharist and expelling the demon, which announced that Jesus Christ commanded Chinese Catholics to visit Sheshan the next March. Another account attributed the exorcism to a priest. A Jesuit named Shen Baishun distributed a pamphlet describing the events, stating that the possessed woman had announced that "doomsday will come in the year 2000" and the "Virgin Mary will shine and make an appearance" the next March in Sheshan. The Chinese government contended that this narrative was spread for counterrevolutionary purposes and prosecuted Shen.

== Films about Catholic exorcists ==
Film	U.S. release date	Director(s)	Screenwriter(s)	Story by	Producer(s)
The Devils	July 16, 1971	Ken Russell	Ken Russell	John Whiting and Aldous Huxley	Robert H. Solo and Ken Russell
The Exorcist	December 26, 1973	William Friedkin	William Peter Blatty	William Peter Blatty	William Peter Blatty
Exorcist II: The Heretic	June 17, 1977	John Boorman	William Goodhart	William Peter Blatty	John Boorman and Richard Lederer
Amityville II: The Possession	September 24, 1982	Damiano Damiani	Tommy Lee Wallace and Dardano Sacchetti	Hans Holzer	Ira N. Smith, Stephen R. Greenwald, and José López Rodero
The Exorcist III	August 17, 1990	William Peter Blatty	William Peter Blatty	William Peter Blatty	Carter DeHaven and James G. Robinson
Repossessed	September 14, 1990	Bob Logan	Bob Logan	Bob Logan	Steve Wizan and Mario Kassar
Amityville 4: The Evil Escapes	May 12, 1999	Sandor Stern	Sandor Stern	John G. Jones	Steve White
Possessed	October 22, 2000	Steven E. de Souza	Michael Lazarou and Steven E. de Souza	Thomas B. Allen	Barbara Title
Exorcist: The Beginning	August 20, 2004	Renny Harlin	Alexi Hawley	William Wisher and Caleb Carr	James G. Robinson
Dominion: Prequel to the Exorcist	May 20, 2005	Paul Schrader	William Wisher Jr. and Caleb Carr		James G. Robinson
The Exorcism of Emily Rose	September 9, 2005	Scott Derrickson	Scott Derrickson and Paul Harris Boardman	Scott Derrickson and Paul Harris Boardman	Tom Rosenberg, Gary Lucchesi, Paul Harris Boardman, Tripp Vinson, and Beau Flynn
The Rite	January 28, 2011	Mikael Håfström	Michael Petroni	Matt Baglio	Beau Flynn and Tripp Vinson
Deliver Us / Libera Nos	September 7, 2016	Federica Di Giacomo	Federica Di Giacomo		
Amityville Exorcism	January 3, 2017	Mark Polonia	Billy D'Amato		Mark Polonia
The Devil and Father Amorth	April 20, 2018	William Friedkin	William Friedkin and Mark Kermode		Mickey Liddell, Pete Shilaimon, and Francesco Zippel
Prey for the Devil	October 28, 2022	Daniel Stamm	Robert Zappia	Robert Zappia, Earl Richey Jones, and Todd R. Jones	Paul Brooks, Earl Richey Jones, Todd R. Jones, and Jessica Malanaphy
The Pope's Exorcist	April 6, 2023	Julius Avery	Michael Petroni and Evan Spiliotopoulos	R. Dean McCreary, Chester Hastings, Jeff Katz, and Father Gabriele Amorth	Doug Belgrad, Michael Patrick Kaczmarek, and Jeff Katz
The Exorcist: Believer	October 13, 2023	David Gordon Green	David Gordon Green and Peter Sattler	Scott Teems, Danny McBride, and David Gordon Green	Jason Blum, David Robinson, and James G. Robinson
Triumph Over Evil: Battle of the Exorcists	October 30, 2025		International Association of Exorcists		

== See also ==
- Aspergillum
- Exorcism in Christianity
- Faith: The Unholy Trinity, a video game about Catholic exorcisms, amongst other themes.
- Minor exorcism in the Catholic Church
- Saint Michael's Prayer against Satan and the Rebellious Angels
- Spiritual warfare
