= Jeremy Davies (exorcist) =

English Roman Catholic priest and exorcist (1935–2022)

The Reverend Fr. Jeremy Davies
- Exorcist
- Church: Roman Catholic Church
- Archdiocese: Archdiocese of Westminster
- Other post: Priest

Orders
- Ordination: 15 April 1974
- Consecration: Archdiocese of Westminster by John Heenan
- Rank: Priest

Personal details
- Born: 25 March 1935 Wimbledon, London, England
- Died: 5 November 2022 (aged 87) Walsingham, Norfolk, England
- Buried: 2 December 2022 in church cemetery St Mary and All Saints, Little Walsingham
- Denomination: Roman Catholic
- Residence: Walsingham (2021-2022); Our Lady Help of Christians Church (1996-2021)
- Parents: Idris Meredyth Davies, Elizabeth Prudence Ponsonby
- Occupation: Priest
- Profession: Priest; Exorcist
- Education: King's School, Canterbury and St Edmund Hall, Oxford

Jeremy Ponsonby Meredyth Davies (25 March 1935 – 5 November 2022) was an English Roman Catholic priest and physician. Davies was a leading exorcist and co-founder of the International Association of Exorcists.

== Early life ==
Jeremy Ponsonby Meredyth Davies was born on 25 March 1935 in Wimbledon, London to Idris and Elizabeth Davies. He was educated at The King's School, Canterbury.

Davies studied English literature at St Edmund Hall, Oxford and studied medicine at St Bartholomew's Hospital, London. He graduated with a medical degree in 1967, then worked in Mission Hospitals in Guyana, Nigeria and Ghana.

He then became House Surgeon at Redhill General Hospital in Surrey.

== Ordained ministry ==
Jeremy Davies became a Catholic in 1966 at the age of 31 when he was baptised at the church of St Charles Borromeo Church, Westminster (Ogle Street, London). He was ordained a Roman Catholic priest in 1974. He served as a chaplain at Westminster Cathedral from 1974 to 1976, then as an assistant priest at St. Mary’s, Chelsea, from 1976 to 1979. During this time he became deeply involved in the Pro-Life movement and also spent time in Rome training as an exorcist. He established the annual Pilgrimage of Reparation and Prayer for the Sanctity of Life, centred on Walsingham, Norfolk, in 1984.

Father Davies was appointed exorcist of the Westminster Archdiocese in Great Britain in 1987. In 1993, he co-founded, along with Father Gabriele Amorth and four others, the International Association of Exorcists which now has hundreds of members worldwide.

From 1997 to 2005, Father Davies was parish priest for Puckeridge and Old Hall Green, Hertfordshire; on turning 70 in 2005, he became an assistant priest at Our Lady Help of Christians in Luton. In 2021, aged 86, he retired to Walsingham. Davies died peacefully in Fakenham on 5 November 2022.

== Personal life and death ==
Davies died at Walsingham Priory on 5 November 2022, at the age of 87.

== Quotes ==
- On exorcisms: "There are people in need, and the Church is dealing with the problem more effectively."
