= Vincent Lampert =

American Roman Catholic exorcist

The Reverend Vincent Lampert
- Born: April 7, 1963 (age 63)
- Education: Indiana University Bloomington; Saint Meinrad Seminary and School of Theology (MDiv); Pontifical North American College
- Occupations: Catholic priest Exorcist (since 2005)

Ecclesiastical career
- Religion: Christianity
- Church: Roman Catholic Church
- Ordained: June 1, 1991
- Congregations: St. Peter's Church, Brookville and St. Michael the Archangel Church, Brookville (2018–2025); St. Simon the Apostle Catholic Church, Indianapolis (since July 2025)

Vincent Lampert (born 1963) is an American Catholic priest and the designated exorcist of the Roman Catholic Archdiocese of Indianapolis. Lampert was appointed to become an exorcist by Archbishop Daniel M. Buechlien.

== Life and work ==
Vincent Lampert was born April 7, 1963, and was ordained on June 1, 1991. He is assigned as the Pastor of both St. Peter and St. Michael the Archangel Catholic Churches in Brookville, Indiana. He grew up in a large Roman Catholic family that was active in the faith on the west side of Indianapolis, Indiana. His favorite quote is also known as the Jesus Prayer, "Lord Jesus Christ, Son of the living God, have mercy on me, a sinner." In 1981 he graduated from Cardinal Ritter High School. For a couple of years he studied political sciences at Indiana University - Bloomington, before transferring to the Saint Meinrad Seminary to study for the priesthood. Father Vince received his Master of Divinity degree from the Benedictine monks who own and operate Saint Meinrad Archabbey.

== Exorcism ==
Father Vince Lampert received his exorcism classroom training at the Pontifical North American College in Rome, Italy. He was in the same training class with Father Gary Thomas, the exorcist for San Jose, California, US. Matt Baglio wrote the book, The Rite: The Making of a Modern Exorcist based on Father Gary Thomas, that later became the 2011 movie, The Rite. Lampert received practical experience, by assisting on over 40 exorcisms with Father Carmine de Filippis, who is the mentor for exorcists in the Diocese of Rome. While speaking to students about exorcism at Seton Hall University about his training, he told them he spent three months training to be an exorcist.

At the invitation of the Newman Center of Montclair State, Lampert gave a talk to the students. He told them about how he went to a local ice cream shop to celebrate, after a year long series of prayers over a person, who was finally released from their demonic situation.

During a 2016 talk with students at Purdue University, Lampert identified various occult practices that could lead a person to be tied to evil. The presence of an evil spirit include bodily contortions, changes in the person's voice, unpleasant odors, and temperature changes in a room.

Lampert consulted on a famous case, as the designated exorcist of the Archdiocese of Indianapolis. Father Michael Maginot, pastor of St. Stephen Martyr Church in Merrillville, Indiana, had permission from his Bishop Dale Joseph Melczek to work with Lampert on a house then owned by Zak Bagans. After various prayers and blessings, including the use of holy water, the house was demolished in 2016.

As a noted expert on exorcism, who is willing to be published in the media about his work, ather Lampert has spoken about the difference between exorcisms that are authorized by the local bishop, compared to fee-based "private exorcists" that work independent of the church. Lampert has met with other exorcists in Rome during meetings with the International Association of Exorcists. When he was appointed as an exorcist in 2005, there were perhaps only 12 exorcists in the US. Today, there are more than 50 that he knows personally in the USA. As one of the noted authorities on exorcism, he was interviewed in documentary movie The Rite of Exorcism: Myth, Mystery & Hope along with other noted exorcists like Fr. Gabriele Amorth and Fr. José Antonio Fortea. His first exorcism case as documented in an episode during the 2013 season of the cable television network Syfy series Paranormal Witness. When the Fox TV Show The Exorcist was released a Fox TV News crew did a two-minute interview with the exorcist that is sought out for interviews from around the world for his commentary on the series. Lampert was quoted in an article by The Atlantic that as of October 2018 he had received 1,700 phone or email requests for exorcisms, the most he had ever in a year.

Lampert once said that exorcisms were on the rise due to a wavering faith in the Church and factors like drug abuse. As his case load increased, a center to provide training for exorcist priests and deacons was set up in the United States to teach courses to clergy only. The Pope Leo XIII Institute was founded in Milwaukee in 2012 to assist in training for exorcists.

== Movies and television ==
- The Rite of Exorcism: Myth, Mystery & Hope (2011)
- Paranormal Witness (2011-) (episode aired November 20, 2013)
- Paranormal Declassified: S1E6 "Gateway to Hell" January 26, 2021
