= Jeremy Davies (disambiguation) =

Jeremy Davies is an American actor.

Jeremy Davies or Davis may also refer to:

- Jeremy Davies (exorcist) (1935–2022), English Roman Catholic priest and former physician
- Jérémy Davies (born 1996), Canadian ice hockey player
- Jeremy Davis (born 1985), American bassist
- Geremy Davis (born 1992), American football player
