= Exorcism in Christianity =

Practice of casting out demons from a person

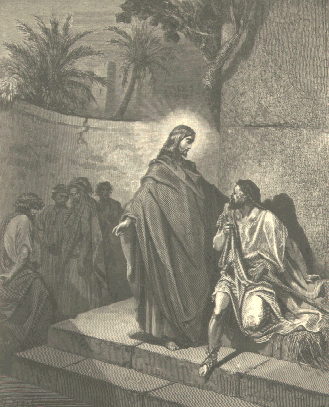
Christ Exorcising a Mute by Gustav Dore, 1865.

In Christianity, exorcism involves the practice of casting out one or more demons from a person whom they believe to have been possessed by demons. The person performing the exorcism, known as an exorcist, is often a member of the Christian Church, or an individual thought to be graced with special powers or skills. The exorcist may use prayers and religious material, such as set formulas, gestures, symbols, icons, or amulets. The exorcist often invokes God, Jesus, angels and archangels, and various saints to aid with the exorcism. Christian exorcists most commonly cast out demons in Jesus' name.

The concepts of demonic possession and exorcism are found in the Bible and were practiced by the early Christians, especially gaining prominence in the 2nd century.

In general, people considered to be possessed are not regarded as evil in themselves, nor wholly responsible for their actions, because possession is considered to be manipulation of an unwilling victim by a demon resulting in harm to self or others. Accordingly, practitioners regard exorcism as more of a cure than a punishment. The mainstream rituals usually take this into account, making sure that there is no violence to the possessed, only that they be tied down if there is potential for violence. However, some believe possession is a voluntary act, where individuals permit demons to subjugate them.

== Old Testament ==
The Catholic Encyclopedia says that there is only one apparent case of this demonic possession in the Old Testament, of King Saul being tormented by an "evil spirit" (1 Samuel 16:14), but it relies on a reading of the Hebrew word "rûah" as "evil spirit", an interpretation doubted by the Catholic Encyclopedia. The Catholic Encyclopedia ties exorcism methods mentioned in extra-canonical Jewish literature to the driving off of a demon in the Book of Tobias. Some theologians such as Ángel Manuel Rodríguez say that mediums like the ones mentioned in Leviticus 20:27 were possessed by demons.

David Bar-Cohn states that authors of the Priestly Law believed in demons but "de-mythologized" them as nameless, destructive forces that were under YHWH's control. Likewise, the Torah criticizes as superstitious the belief that isha katlanit (twice-widowed women) possessed demonic powers so they could kill their husbands (e.g. Judah refusing to marry Shelah to Tamar, whose previous husbands died due to sin).

Israelite belief in demons derived from their semi-nomadic ancestors, who believed demons could be warded off with sacrificial blood. This belief was subsequently preserved in holidays such as Passover.

== New Testament ==
Christian exorcism is founded on the belief that Jesus commanded his followers to expel evil spirits in his name. The Catholic Encyclopedia article on Exorcism says Jesus points to this ability as a sign of his Messiahship, and that he has empowered his disciples to do the same.

The Lutheran Church–Missouri Synod traces the practice of exorcism to the Scriptural claim that Jesus Christ expelled demons with a simple command (Mark 1:23–26; 9:14–29; Luke 11:14–26). The apostles continued the practice with the power and in the name of Jesus (Matthew 10:1; Acts 19:11–16).

The Jewish Encyclopedia article on Jesus states that Jesus, "was devoted especially to casting out demons," and also believed that he passed this on to his followers; however, "his superiority to his followers was shown by his casting out demons which they had failed to expel."

Matthew Poole believes demon possessions were more common in the New Testament so that Jesus could prove his authority over demons to audiences. He also believes God allowed these possessions to correct the 'error' of the Sadducees, who did not believe in spirits. But Reed Carlson argues that belief in demon possession has roots in earlier Israelite literature. Israelites believed that possession was "a corporate and cultivated practice that can function as social commentary and as a means to model the moral self".

== History ==
=== Early church ===
St. Cyril of Jerusalem wrote, "Receive the exorcisms with devotion...Divine exorcisms, borrowed from the Scripture, purify the soul."

The First Epistle to the Corinthians in 11:10, according to the early Church Father Tertullian, referenced the Watchers. Tertullian taught that the lust of the Watchers was the reason for Saint Paul's directive to Christian women to wear a headcovering for protection. Tertullian referenced the case of a woman who was touched on the neck by a fallen angel "who found her to be a temptation".

=== Middle Ages ===
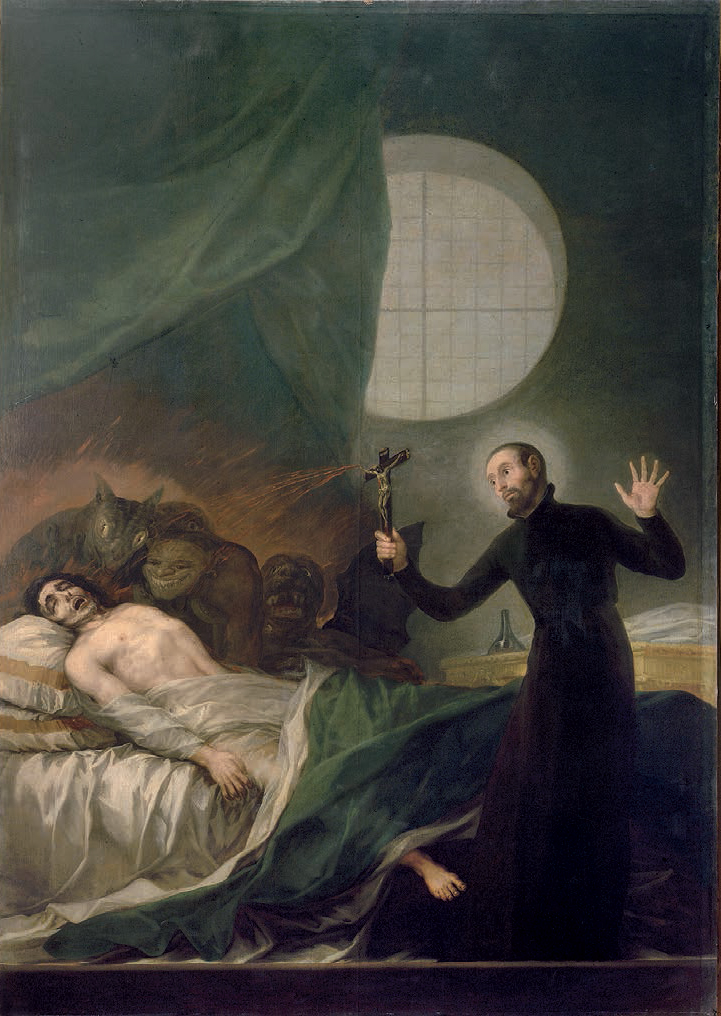
Painting in the Valencia Cathedral by Francisco Goya of Saint Francis Borgia performing an exorcism.

The Benedictine formula Vade retro satana has been used since the medieval era.

As emphasis on holy items in churches grew over the course of the medieval era, Benedict of Aniane, in his Supplementum to the Gregorian Sacramentary, suggested exorcism as a means of purifying salt and water for use in Holy Water, in turn used for regular benedictions but also human exorcisms. These material exorcisms were directly addressed at the subject substances, in this instance, at water:

I exorcise you creature of water in the name of God the omnipotent Father, and in the name of Jesus Christ his son, our lord, that you should become exorcized water for the routing of every power of the enemy and to eradicate and uproot the enemy himself with his apostate angels, through the power of our lord.

Lollardy opposed the practice of exorcisms. The Twelve Conclusions of the Lollards written in 1395 asserts that the exorcisms and hallowings carried out by priests are a sort of witchcraft and are incompatible with Christian theology.

In the 15th century, Catholic exorcists were both clerical and lay, since every Christian has the power to command demons and drive them out in the name of Christ.

The Roman Missal promulgated by Pope Paul V contained the Latin exorcism titled De exorcizzandis obsessiis a daemonio ("On the exorcism of the people possessed by Satan").

=== Reformation ===
After the Protestant Reformation, Martin Luther abbreviated the Roman ritual used for exorcism. In 1526, the ritual was further abbreviated and the exsufflation was omitted. This form of the Lutheran Ritual for Exorcism was incorporated into the majority of the Lutheran service-books and implemented.

== Current beliefs and practices ==
=== Anglicanism ===
==== Church of England ====
As the Bishop of Exeter, Robert Mortimer set up an exorcism commission, which published its report in 1973.

In 1974, the Church of England set up the "deliverance ministry". As part of its creation, every diocese in the country was equipped with a team trained in both exorcism and psychiatry. According to its representatives, most cases brought before it have conventional explanations, and actual exorcisms are quite rare; blessings, though, are sometimes given to people with psychological conditions.

Anglican priests may not perform an exorcism without permission from the Diocesan bishop. An exorcism is not usually performed unless the bishop and his team of specialists (including a psychiatrist and physician) have approved it.

==== Episcopal Church in the United States ====
In the Episcopal Church, the Book of Occasional Services discusses provision for exorcism, stating that cases are to be referred to the diocesan bishop for consultation. There is no specific rite, nor an office of "exorcist". Diocesan exorcists usually continue in their role when they have retired from all other church duties. The Order of Christ the Saviour is a Dominican religious order that trains exorcists and deliverance ministers in the Episcopal Church.

=== Baptists ===
Albert Mohler, the ninth president of the Southern Baptist Theological Seminary, states that Baptists, among other evangelical Christians, do

believe in the existence, malevolence, and power of the Devil and demons. About these things, the New Testament is abundantly clear. We must resist any effort to 'demythologize' the New Testament in order to deny the existence of these evil forces and beings. At the same time, we must recognize quickly that the Devil and demons are not accorded the powers often ascribed to them in popular piety. The Devil is indeed a threat, as Peter made clear when he warned: 'Be sober-minded; be watchful. Your adversary the devil prowls around like a roaring lion, seeking someone to devour.' [1 Peter 5:8] The New Testament is also clear that very real cases of demonic possession were encountered by Jesus and his followers. Jesus liberated afflicted individuals as he commanded the demons to flee, and they obeyed him. Likewise, the Apostle Paul performed exorcisms as he confronted the powers of evil and darkness in his ministry. A closer look at the crucial passages involved reveals no rite of exorcism, however, just the name of Jesus and the proclamation of the Gospel. Likewise, there is no notion of a priestly ministry of ordained exorcists in the New Testament.

As a result of this theology, Baptists argue that the weapons of "warfare are spiritual, and the powers that the forces of darkness most fear are the name of Jesus, the authority of the Bible, and the power of his Gospel."

=== Catholicism ===
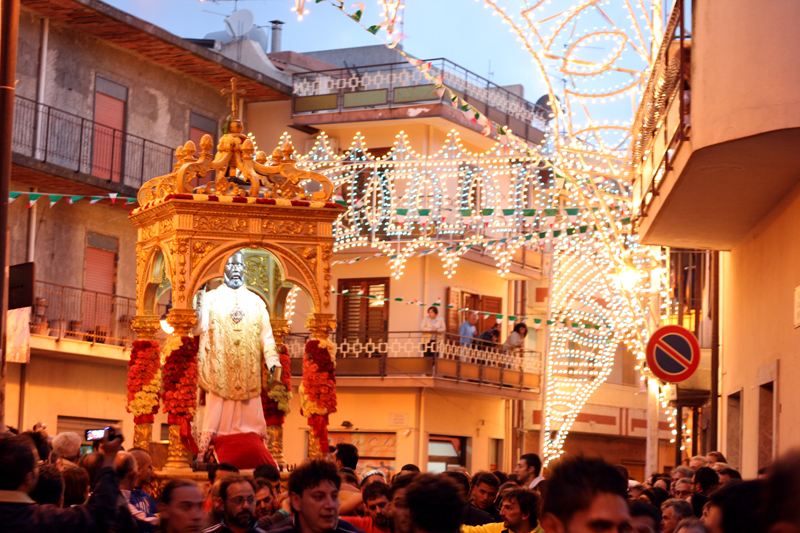
The statue of Saint Philip of Agira with the Gospel in his left hand, the symbol of the exorcists, in the May celebrations in his honor at Limina, Sicily

In Catholic dogma, exorcism is a sacramental but not a sacrament, unlike baptism or confession. Unlike a sacrament, exorcism's "integrity and efficacy do not depend ... on the rigid use of an unchanging formula or on the ordered sequence of prescribed actions. Its efficacy depends on two elements: authorization from valid and licit Church authorities, and the faith of the exorcist."

The Catholic Church revised the Rite of Exorcism in January 1999, though the traditional Rite of Exorcism in Latin is allowed as an option. The act of exorcism is considered to be an incredibly dangerous spiritual task. The ritual assumes that possessed persons retain their free will, though the demon may hold control over their physical body, and involves prayers, blessings, and invocations with the use of the document Of Exorcisms and Certain Supplications. In the modern era, Catholic bishops rarely authorize exorcisms, approaching would-be cases with the presumption that mental or physical illness is the more probable cause.

Solemn exorcisms, according to the Canon law of the Church, can be exercised only by an ordained priest or higher prelate, with the express permission of the local bishop, and only after a careful medical examination of the victim to exclude the possibility of mental illness, and in the ritual people cannot in any circumstance be harmed. The Catholic Encyclopedia (1908) enjoined: "Superstition ought not to be confounded with religion, however much their history may be interwoven, nor magic, however white it may be, with a legitimate religious rite." Signs listed in the Roman Ritual as being indicators of possible demonic possession include: speaking foreign or ancient languages of which the possessed has no prior knowledge; supernatural abilities and strength; knowledge of hidden or remote things which the possessed has no way of knowing; an aversion to anything holy; and profuse blasphemy and/or sacrilege.

Fr. Gabriele Amorth, who claimed to have performed 160,000 exorcisms, said exorcists have the ability to detect an evil presence. However, he notes that "they are not always right: their 'feelings' must be checked out." In his examples, they are able to detect the events that caused the demon to enter, or are able to discover the evil object that has cursed the individual. He notes that exorcists "are always humble."

=== Eastern Orthodoxy ===
Receive the exorcisms with devotion...Divine exorcisms, borrowed from the Scripture, purify the soul.

— St. Cyril of Jerusalem

The Eastern Orthodox Church has a rich and complex tradition of exorcism, tracing the practice back to Christ and his apostles. Orthodox Christians believe demonic activity is the devil's primary means of corrupting humanity and rebelling against God. Disease, blight, and other maladies are widely associated with satanic influence, which can influence or infest even objects. As a result, exorcisms are quite common, even finding their way in rituals involving the blessing of fields.

All liturgical books, such as the Euchologion, contain prayers of exorcism, namely by St. Basil the Great and St. John Chrysostom. The Eastern Orthodox Church lacks a special organization of exorcists akin to the Catholic International Association of Exorcists; rather, all priests are trained and equipped to perform exorcisms. This is due in part to the baptismal liturgy in Eastern Orthodoxy containing an exorcism ritual.

Orthodox theology holds that every Christian performs an exorcism through their struggle against sin and evil:

[T]he whole Church, past, present and future, has the task of an exorcist to banish sin, evil, injustice, spiritual death, the devil from the life of humanity ... Both healing and exorcising are ministered through prayers, which spring from faith in God and from love for man ... All the prayers of healing and exorcism, composed by the Fathers of the Church and in use since the third century, begin with the solemn declaration: In Thy Name, O Lord.

Though officially discouraged by the church, many lay Orthodox Christians believe in Vaskania, or the "evil eye", in which malevolent thoughts or intentions (namely jealousy and envy) can cause harm and destruction to their recipients. Although the church rejects the power of the evil eye, which it traces to pagan superstition, it recognizes the phenomenon as being morally and spiritually problematic, such that it is a legitimate target for exorcism.

=== Lutheranism ===
The Lutheran Church traces the practice of exorcism to the Scriptural claim that Jesus Christ expelled demons with a simple command (Mark 1:23–26; 9:14–29; Luke 11:14–26). The apostles continued the practice with the power and in the name of Jesus (Matthew 10:1; Acts 19:11–16). Contrary to some denominations of Christianity, Lutheranism affirms that the individual, both the believer and the non-believer, can be plagued by demons, based on several arguments, including the one that "just as a believer, whom Jesus Christ has delivered from sin (Romans 6:18), can still be bound by sin in his life, so he can still be bound by a demon in his life."

After the Protestant Reformation, Martin Luther abbreviated the Roman ritual used for exorcism. In 1526, the ritual was further abbreviated and the exsufflation was omitted. This form of the Lutheran Ritual for Exorcism was incorporated into the majority of the Lutheran service-books and implemented. According to a Pastoral Handbook of the Lutheran Church,

In general, satanic possession is nothing other than an action of the devil by which, from God's permission, men are urged to sin, and he occupies their bodies, in order that they might lose eternal salvation. Thus bodily possession is an action by which the devil, from divine permission, possesses both pious and impious men in such a way that he inhabits their bodies not only according to activity, but also according to essence, and torments them, either for the punishment or for the discipline and testing of men, and for the glory of divine justice, mercy, power, and wisdom.

These pastoral manuals warn that often, symptoms such as ecstasy, epileptic seizures, lethargy, insanity, and a frantic state of mind, are the results of natural causes and should not be mistaken for demon possession. According to the Lutheran Church, primary symptoms that may indicate demon possession and the need of an exorcism include:

1. The knowledge of secret things, for example, being able to predict the future (Acts 16:16), find lost people or things, or know complex things that one has never learned (e.g., medicine). It is said that fortune-tellers often ask a spirit for help and that this spirit gives them certain powers. In that case, the evil spirit is assisting, not necessarily possessing the person bodily.
2. The knowledge of languages one has never learned. Just as the devil can bind one's tongue (Luke 11:14), it is reported from the early church as well as the time of the Reformation that certain demon-possessed people could speak languages they had never learned.
3. Supernatural strength (Mark 5:2-3), far beyond what they previously had or should have considering their sex and size. Much caution in judging demon possession is required. All of the circumstances and symptoms must be taken into consideration. Insanity should not be confused with possession. On the other hand, possession may be taking place even where these symptoms are absent.

The Church lists the secondary symptoms of horrible shouting (Mark 5:5), blasphemy of God and jeering at one's neighbor, deformation of movements (e.g. ferocious movements, facial contortion, immodest laughing, gnashing of teeth, spitting, removing clothes, lacerating self, Mk. 9:20; Lk. 8:27.), inhuman revelry (e.g. when they take food beyond the capability of nature), torment of bodies, unusual injuries of the body and of those nearby, extraordinary motion of bodies (e.g., an elderly man who, being demon-possessed, was able to run as fast as a horse), and forgetfulness of things done. Other symptoms include the corruption of reason in man, which make him like an animal, melancholy, the acceleration of death (Mark 9:18 [suicide attempts]), and the presence of other supernatural occurrences.

After these determinations have been made, the Church recommends experienced physicians to determine whether there is a medical explanation for the behaviour of the individual. When a true possession is recognized, the poor one is to be committed to the care of a minister of the Church who teaches sound doctrine, is of a blameless life, who does nothing for the sake of filthy lucre, but does everything from the soul. The pastor is then to diligently inquire what kind of life the possessed one led up to this point and lead him or her through the law to the recognition of his sins. After this admonition or consolation has taken place, the works of a natural physician are to be used, who will cleanse the possessed one from malicious fluids with the appropriate medicines. The Pastoral Handbook then states:

- Let ardent prayers be poured forth to God, not only by the ministers of the Church, but also by the whole Church. Let these prayers be conditioned, if the liberation should happen for God's glory and the salvation of the possessed person, for this is an evil of the body.
- With the prayers let fasting be joined, see Matthew 17:21.
- Alms by friends of the possessed person.
- Let the confession of the Christian faith be once required of Him, let him be taught concerning the works of the devil destroyed by Christ, let him be sent back faithfully to this Destroyer of Satan, Jesus Christ, let an exhortation be set up to faith in Christ, to prayers, to penitence.

=== Mennonites ===
Many Mennonite colleges and seminaries include training for the ministry of exorcism. The Mennonite minister and exorcist Dean Hochstetler states that powwowing, a practice done by some in the Pennsylvania Dutch community, "brings people under bondage to Satan." On 30 July to 1 August 1987, the "Associated Mennonite Biblical Seminaries, Mennonite Board of Missions (MC) and the Indiana-Michigan Mennonite Conference (MC) sponsored a consultation on 'Bondage and Deliverance'."

=== Methodism ===
The British Methodist Church acknowledges three differing views about exorcism: either that it involves "the casting out of an objective power of evil which has gained possession of a person"; "exorcism is a necessary or at least an effective psychological means of reassuring those who believe themselves to be possessed"; or "since demons do not exist ... exorcism would be inappropriate, since what is to be dealt with is false belief." According to the first viewpoint, "the authority to exorcise has been given to the Church as one of the ways in which Christ's Ministry is continued in the world." A minister must first consult the District Chair in order to perform an exorcism. The Methodist Church holds that it is of great importance to ensure that the presence and love of Christ is assured to the individual(s) seeking help. In addition, the ministry of the "Bible, prayer and sacraments" should be extended to these individuals as well. A combination of these things has been proven to be effective.

For example, in one particular situation, a Roman Catholic woman believed that her house was haunted, and therefore consulted her priest for assistance. Since he was not available to drive the demons from the woman's home, she contacted a Methodist minister, who exorcised the evil spirits from a room, which was believed to be the source of distress in the house, and celebrated Holy Communion in the same place; following these actions, there was no longer any problem in the house. In another situation, The Reverend Jay Bartlett writes that a young lady who was involved with "drug abuse, self mutilation, severe abuse, mental torment, Satanism, occult activity, communion with demons, and other evils" was exorcised at Mt. Olive Free Methodist Church in Dallas over a period of seven nights, with "anointing oil, the Word of God (the sword of the Spirit), holy water, the sacred symbols of the cross, the blood of Christ, and consecrated materials [being] utilized to drive out the demons."

=== Oriental Orthodoxy ===
In the Ethiopian Orthodox Tewahedo Church, priests intervene and perform exorcisms on behalf of those believed to be afflicted by demons or buda. According to a 2010 Pew Research Center study, 74% of Christians in Ethiopia claim to have experienced or witnessed an exorcism. Demon-possessed persons are brought to a church or prayer meeting. Often, when an ill person has not responded to modern medical treatment, the affliction is attributed to demons. Unusual or especially perverse deeds, particularly when performed in public, are symptomatic of a demoniac. Superhuman strength – such as breaking one's bindings, as described in the New Testament accounts – along with glossolalia are observed in the afflicted. Amsalu Geleta, in a modern case study, relates elements that are common to Ethiopian Christian exorcisms:

It includes singing praise and victory songs, reading from the Scripture, prayer and confronting the spirit in the name of Jesus. Dialogue with the spirit is another important part of the exorcism ceremony. It helps the counselor (exorcist) to know how the spirit was operating in the life of the demoniac. The signs and events mentioned by the spirit are affirmed by the victim after deliverance.

The exorcism is not always successful, and Geleta notes another instance in which the usual methods were unsuccessful, and the demons apparently left the subject at a later time. In any event, "in all cases the spirit is commanded in no other name than the name of Jesus."

=== Pentecostalism ===
In the Pentecostal Church, the Charismatic Movement, and other less formalized Christian groups, the exorcism ritual can take many forms and belief structures. The most common of these is the deliverance ceremony. Deliverance differs from the exorcism ceremony in that the Devil may have gotten a foothold into a person's life rather than gaining complete control. If complete control has been gained, a full-fledged exorcism is necessary. However, a "spirit-filled Christian" cannot be possessed, based on their beliefs. Within this belief structure, the reasons for the devil to get a foothold are usually explained to be some sort of deviation from theological doctrine or because of pre-conversion activities (like dealing with the occult).

The traditional method for determining if a person needs deliverance is done by having someone present who has the gift of discerning of spirits. This is a gift of the Holy Spirit from 1 Corinthians 12 that allows a person to "sense" in some way an evil presence. While the initial diagnosis is usually uncontested by the congregation, when many people are endowed with this gift in a single congregation, results may vary.

== Criticism ==
Critics of exorcism contend that so-called 'possession' is often, in fact, undiagnosed mental or physical illness and the performance of an exorcism in such cases exacerbates the condition and can even be considered abuse. In one case, a Catholic priest performed unauthorized, fake exorcisms for financial gain. Researchers Nicole M. Bauer and J. Andrew Doole argue that by incorporating "medical-psychiatric expertise in the process of diagnosis", exorcists give legitimacy to demonic possession in modern society and present it as "a valid medical healing practice, superior even to medical solutions".

== Gallery ==
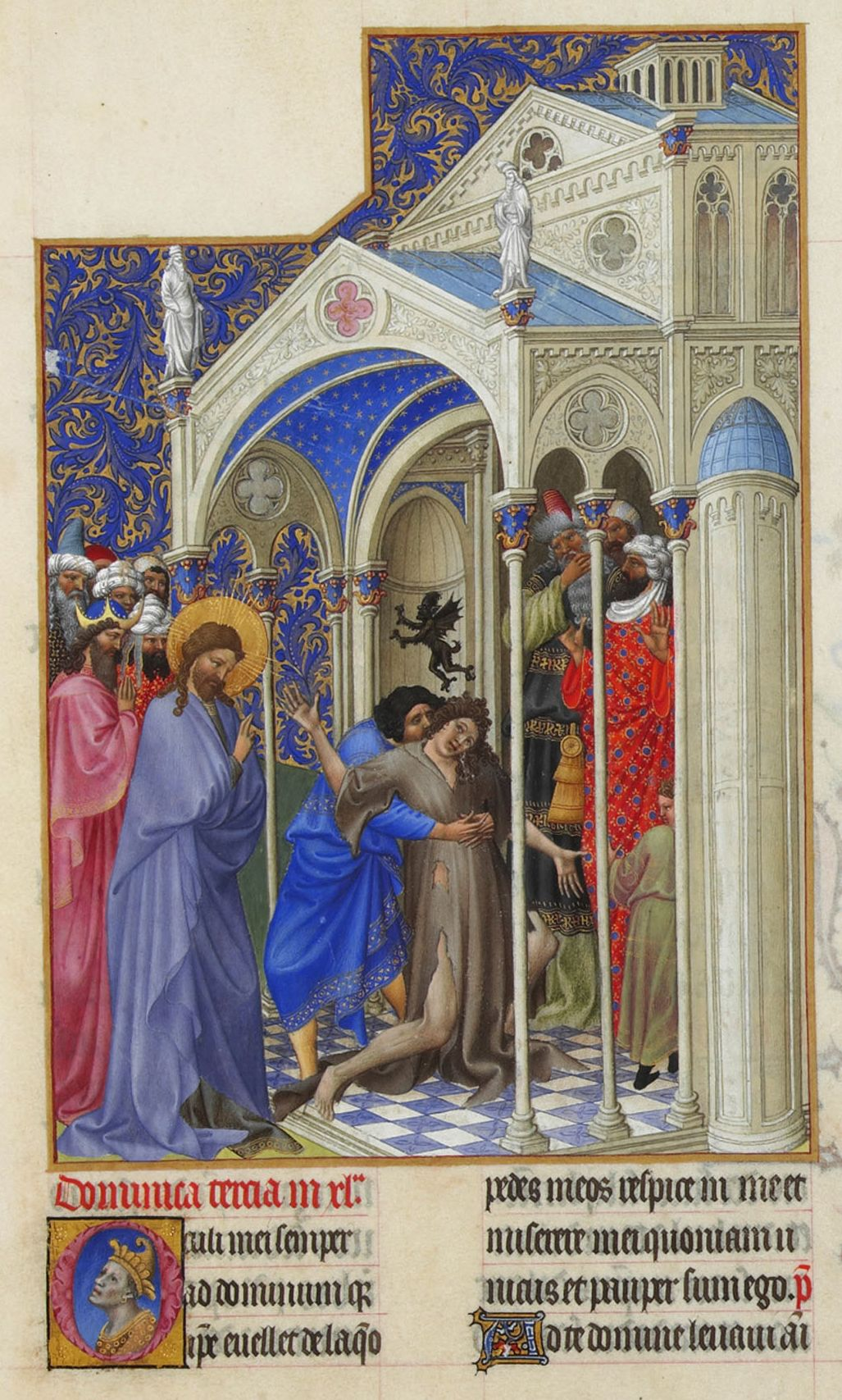
A boy possessed by a demon

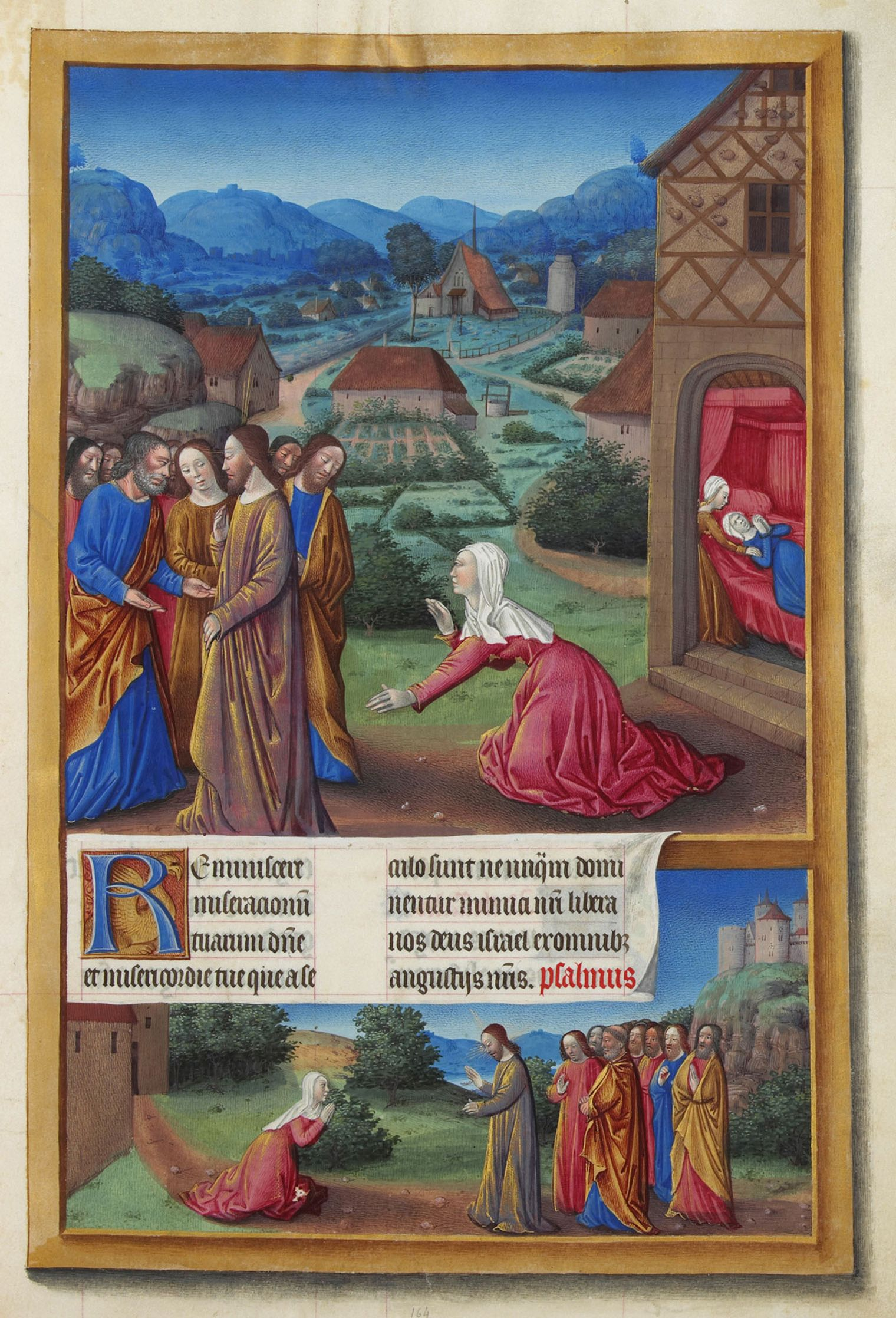
The Canaanite woman's daughter

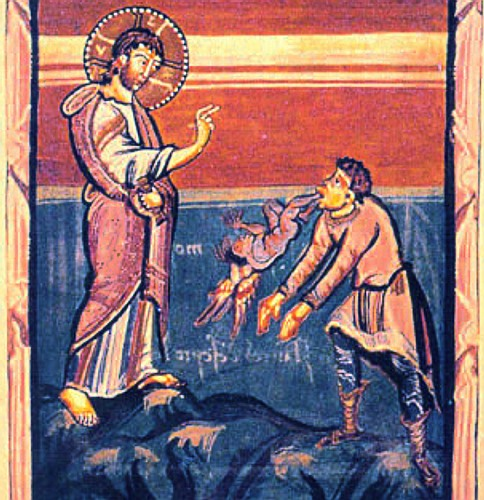
The Gerasenes demonic

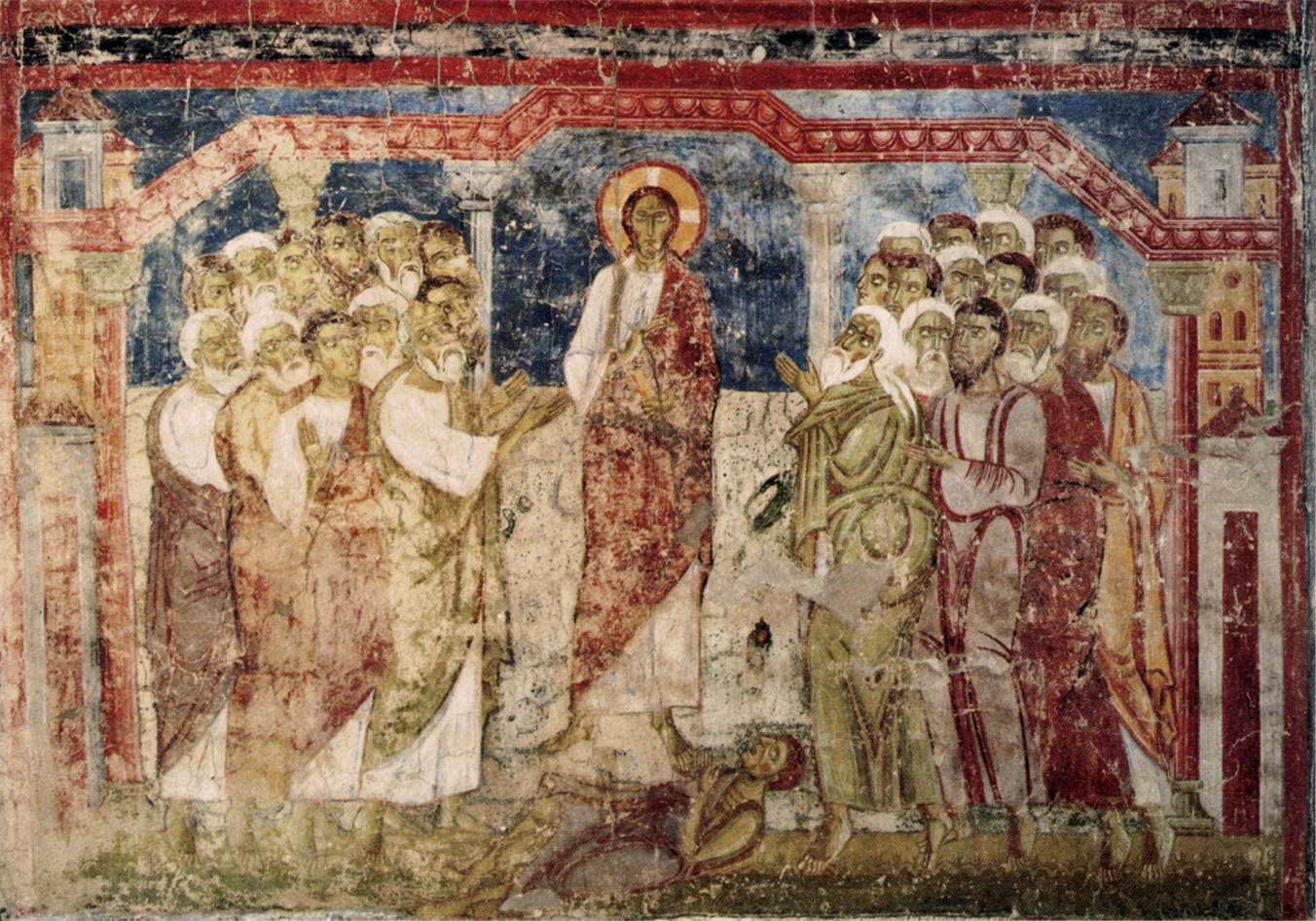
At the Synagogue in Capernaum

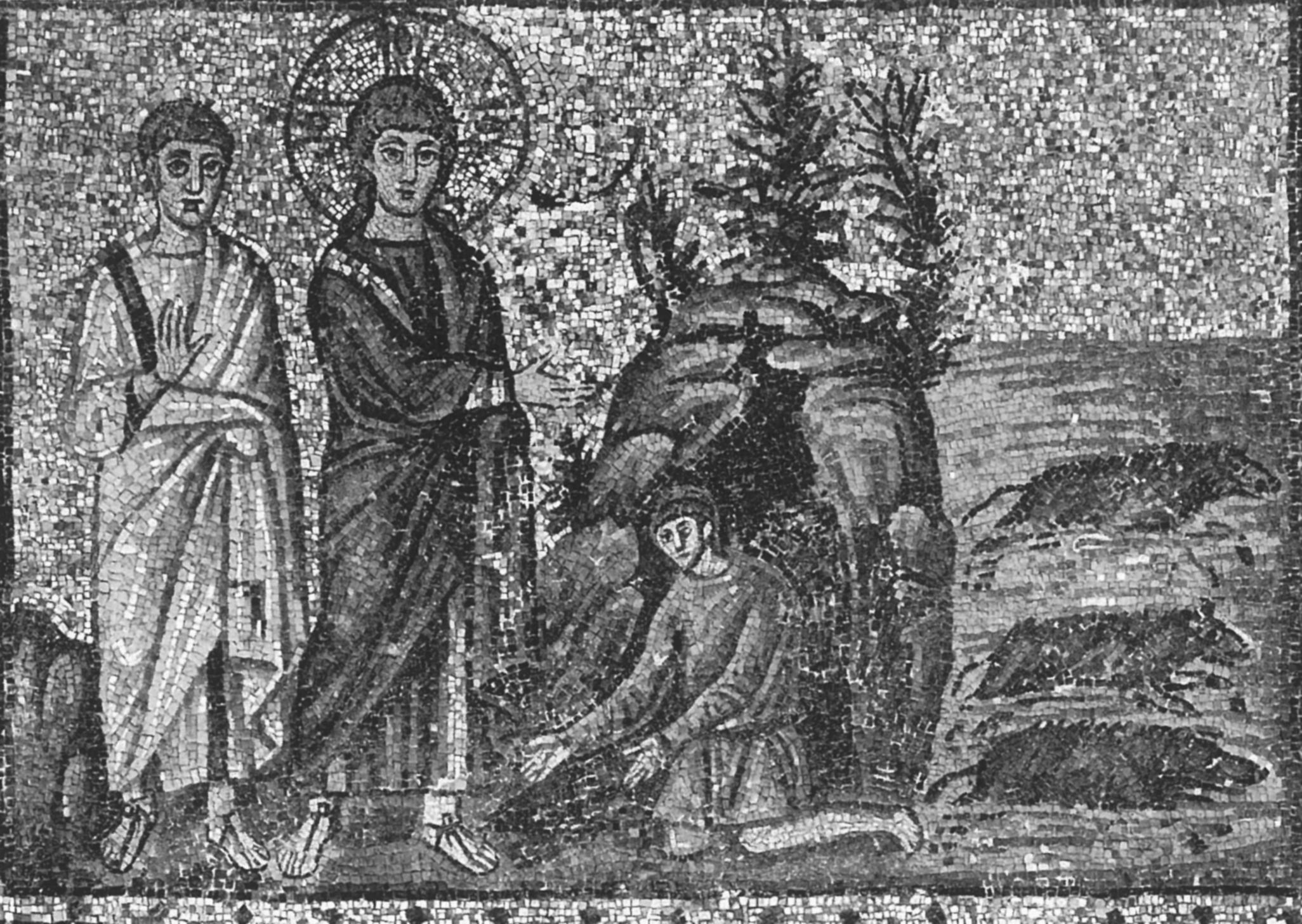
Christ exorcising at sunset

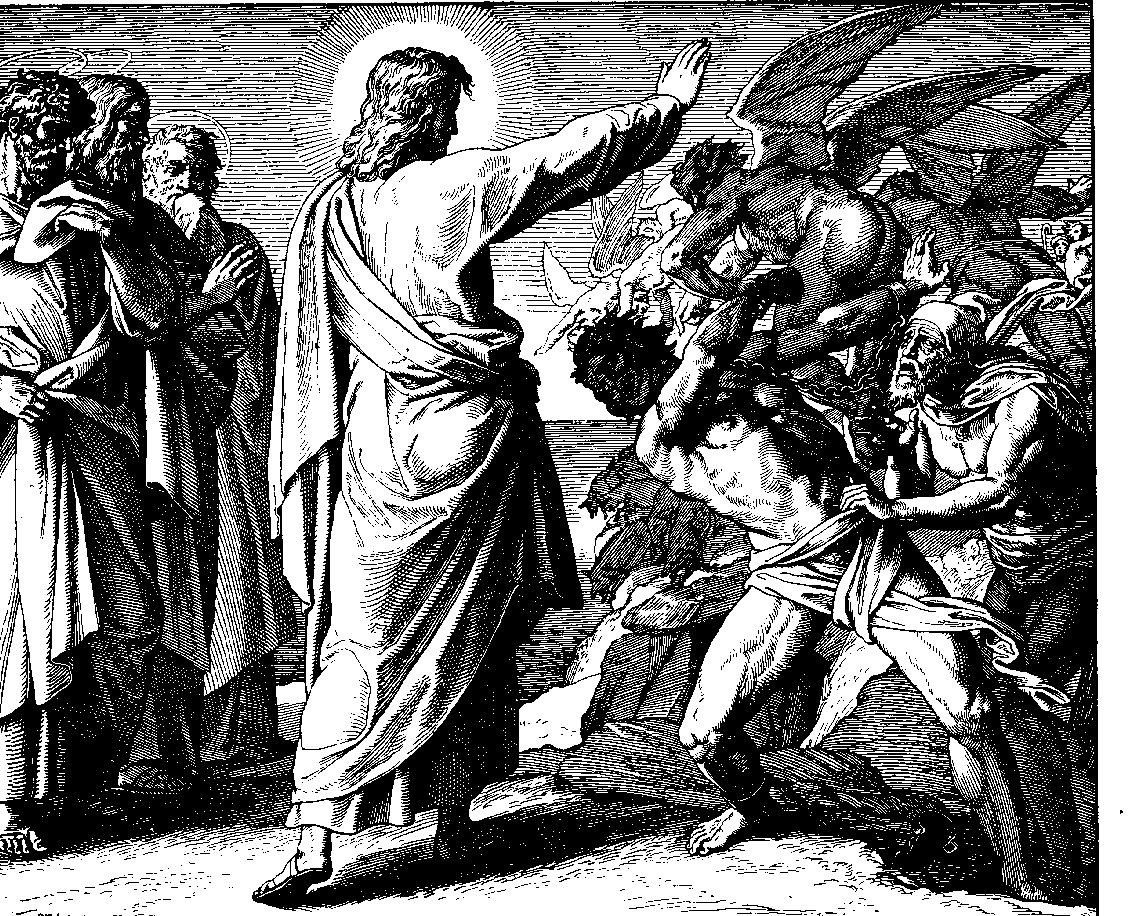
Exorcism of the Gerasene demoniac

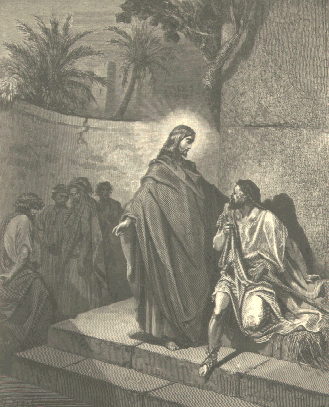
Exorcising a mute

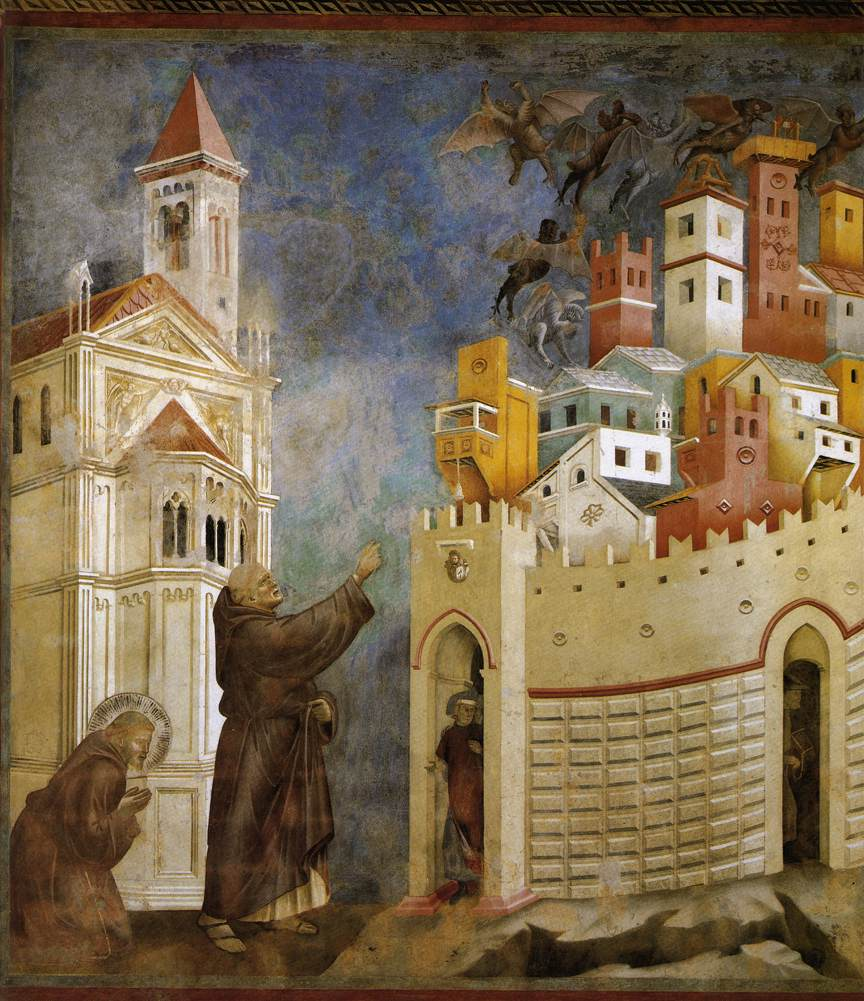
Saint Francis exorcised demons in Arezzo, in a depiction on a fresco by Giotto.

== See also ==
- Deliverance ministry
- Demonic possession
- Emmanuel TV
- International Association of Exorcists
- Minor exorcism in Christianity
- Prayer warrior
- Spiritual warfare
