= Piotr Glas =

Polish priest known for exorcism-related content creation

Piotr Antoni Glas
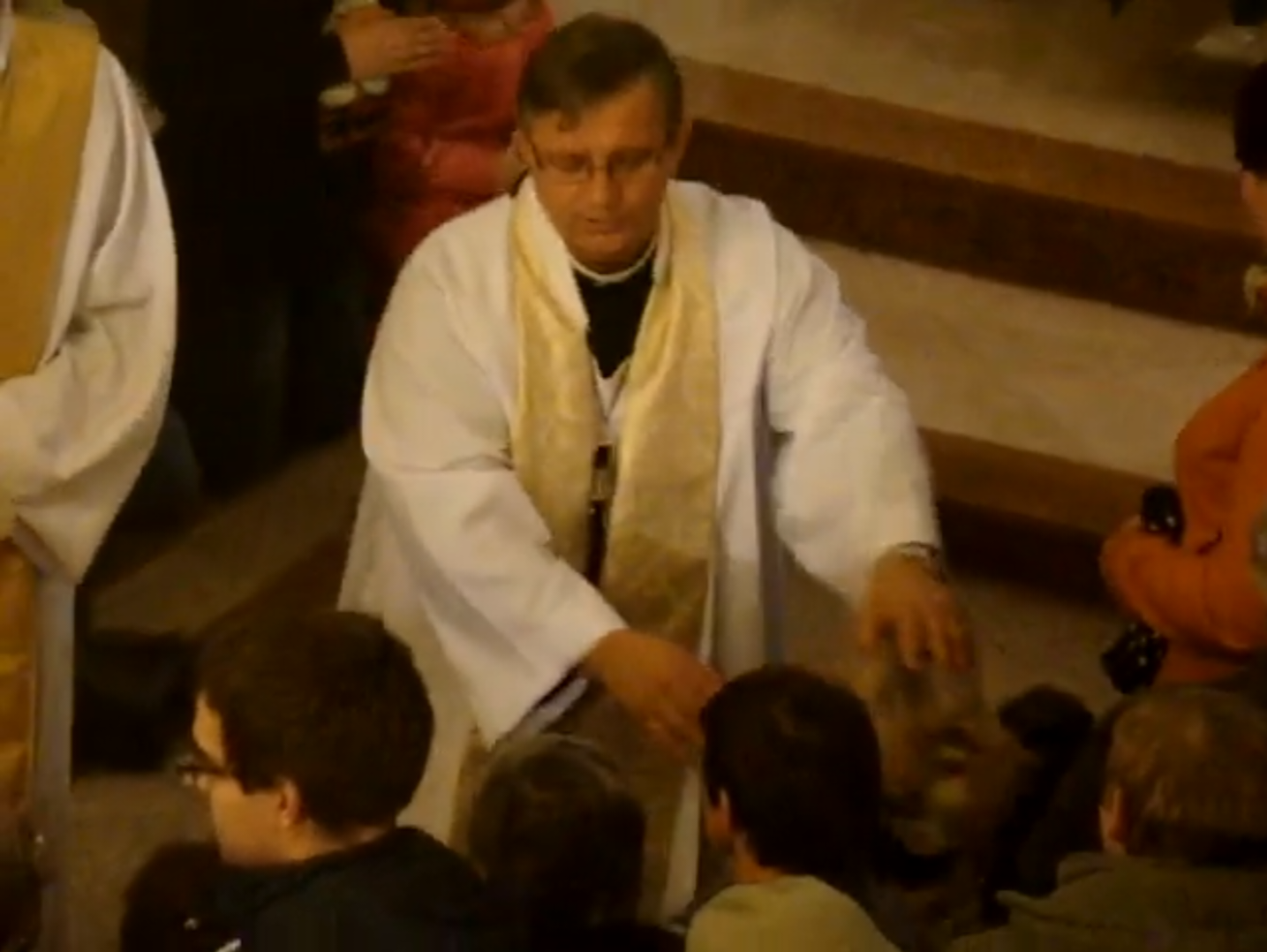
- Born: Rabka-Zdrój, Poland
- Other name: Peter Glas
- Education: Catholic University of Lublin
- Occupations: Priest, exorcist
- Known for: Evangelizing, performing exorcisms

Piotr Antoni Glas is a former Polish Catholic priest and an exorcist. He was attached to the Catholic Diocese of Portsmouth, in the south of England. Glas is one of the most popular Catholic personalities in Poland.

== Early life ==
Piotr Glas was born in Rabka-Zdrój, Poland.

He studied at the Catholic University of Lublin. Initially, he served as a priest in Szczecin.

== Priesthood ==
=== Ministry in Poland ===
Glas is sometimes described as a katocelebryta ("Catholic celebrity"). His often controversial views have been the subject of discussions on the internet, including those with the participation of representatives of the Polish Episcopate. On 15 October 2016, in Jasna Góra, Glas said a prayer for the release of Poland from the effects of sins committed in public space. This prayer event was called the Great Penance.

=== Ministry in Great Britain ===
Glas was pastor in the Diocese of Portsmouth, in Saint Joseph's Parish in Reading. For 10 years of his ministry, in addition to performing his daily duties, he was also an exorcist. He used the name of Peter Glas when serving his British parish, but various sources title him as a father (fr.) or a reverend (rev.).

=== Work as an exorcist ===
Glas regularly conducts exorcisms. As of December 2017, Glas is not officially a Catholic exorcist. According to a statement by Chancellor of the Płock Curia,

At the request of Fr. Bishop Artur G. Miziński, Secretary General of the Polish Bishops' Conference, we provide information about Fr. Piotr Glas. This former member of the Society of Christ for Polish Diaspora, and currently working in the Diocese of Portsmouth in Great Britain, recently conducting many retreat sessions, days of recollection and workshops in Poland - does not have a formal consent to perform the service of an exorcist.

Opinions collected and sent to the Ordinaries as of December 2017 state that Glas was not legally subject to any of the Polish bishops, as he was a priest of the Diocese of Portsmouth and was "no longer an exorcist". This was presented as an informal opinion by the Polish Episcopate about Glas. Glas' activities as an exorcist were criticised outside the church.

== Publications ==
About his experiences with the work of an exorcist, Fr. Piotr Glas writes in his books and articles.

=== Selected works ===
- 2017: Dzisiaj trzeba wybrać. O potędze Maryi, walce duchowej i czasach ostatecznych
- 2018: Dekalog. Prawdziwa droga w czasach zamętu
- 2019: 40 dni walki duchowej
- 2019: Ostatnie wołanie Maryi
- 2020: Ocalenie w Maryi. Pakiet ratunkowy w czasach dramatu Kościoła i świata
- 2022: Ostateczna bitwa o rodzinę
- 2022: Noc bluźnierstw. W oczekiwaniu na świt

== Controversies and beliefs ==
Glas has expressed disdain for multiple behaviors, identities and interests, including yoga, playing Pokémon Go, tantra, prosperity gospel, Toronto blessings, premarital sex, intellectualism, homosexuality, tattoos, gender transitioning, gospel choirs, New Age, horoscopes, talismans, and Halloween.

=== Poland as the last bastion of Catholicism ===
On the role of Poland and the mission of Poles in God's plan of salvation, Fr. Piotr Glas stated: "Today we are witnessing a great spiritual battle for life and death. In my opinion, Poland will play a huge role in this. We are probably the only country in Europe where the Church still survives, where the traditional faith is maintained, churches are not sold, they are not empty". According to Fr. Glas, Poland is going to be the ground zero for global, Catholic faith revival.

=== Sexual misconduct conviction ===
In June 2024, Glas was accused of sexual offences involving a boy. The former priest at St. Joseph's Church in Tilehurst was charged with a total of 10 offences, comprising eight counts of gross indecency with a child and two counts of indecent assault on a child. The Diocese of Portsmouth confirmed that the charges related to incidents that took place between 2002 and 2008 during his time in Jersey, over ten years before his service in Reading. The Catholic Diocese of Portsmouth said in a statement: "Since the concern was raised, and in accordance with our safeguarding policies and procedures, Fr Glas has not been in public ministry".

In April 2025 he was found guilty of three of the counts of gross indecency.

== Cultural phenomenon ==
Glas is one of the most popular Catholic personalities in Poland, being featured in a variety of Catholic media, such as Fronda, Deon, PCH24 or Misyjne.pl as an interviewee or a guest contributor. He is also featured regularly in secular media, such as Onet, TVN or NaTemat, where he is often portrayed like an oddity, such as when he claimed that tattoos are a form of demonic sacrifice, because the ink for those is cursed and dedicated to the Satan.
