= International Association of Exorcists =

Roman Catholic organization founded in 1994

- Italian: Associazione internazionale degli esorcisti
- Abbreviation: AIE
- Formation: 1994 (32 years ago)
- Founders: Gabriele Amorth, Jeremy Davies
- Founded at: Rome, Italy
- Type: Private association of the Christian faithful
- Location: Rome, Italy
- Services: Exorcism
- Key people: Fr. Francesco Bamonte, Msgr. Karel Orlita
- Parent organization: Catholic Church

The International Association of Exorcists (Italian: Associazione internazionale degli esorcisti), abbreviated as AIE, is a Roman Catholic organization which was founded in 1994 by six priests including the exorcist of Rome, Father Gabriele Amorth and Father Jeremy Davies. Its statutes were approved by the Catholic Church on June 13, 2014. The AIE provides training and support to exorcists, and also helps to raise awareness of the issue of demonic possession. It has around 250 members from 30 countries. Its members are all priests who have been authorized by their bishops to perform exorcisms. The organization is composed of mostly Catholic priests, as well as some Anglican and Orthodox priests.

== History ==
Although the membership is restricted and exclusive, by 2000 there were over two hundred members, who meet bi-annually in Rome. The association sends out a quarterly newsletter where members can tell of particularly interesting or difficult cases. An exorcist priest must have the permission of his bishop to join the group.

Within the Roman Catholic Church a priest may only perform an exorcism with the express consent of his bishop or local ordinary, and only, to the extent necessary, after an examination of the patient by doctors and psychiatrists in order to determine that the affliction has no natural origin. A priest is required by canon law to be devout, knowledgeable, prudent, and respected for his integrity.

Father Amorth began the organization in the hopes of increasing the number of official exorcists worldwide and to alert more dioceses about the issue of the increasing number of demonic possessions, which he believed had been ignored or suppressed by some priests and bishops. During his lifetime, Father Amorth was the honorary president of AIE. His successor as president was Father Giancarlo Gramolazzo, who died in November 2010 and was succeeded in turn by Capuchin Father Cipriano de Meo (born January 5, 1924), Fr. Francesco Bamonte, and then by Msgr. Karel Orlita, the current president.

== See also ==
- Exorcism in the Catholic Church
- Demonology
- Prayer to Saint Michael
