= The Devil and Father Amorth =

- Theatrical release poster
- Directed by: William Friedkin
- Written by: William Friedkin; Mark Kermode
- Produced by: Mickey Liddell; Pete Shilaimon; Francesco Zippel
- Starring: Gabriele Amorth
- Narrated by: William Friedkin
- Edited by: Gary Leva
- Music by: Christopher Rouse
- Production company: LD Entertainment
- Distributed by: The Orchard
- Release dates: August 31, 2017 (Venice); April 20, 2018 (United States)
- Running time: 69 minutes
- Country: United States
- Language: English
- Box office: $20,449

The Devil and Father Amorth is a 2017 American documentary directed by William Friedkin showing the ninth exorcism of an Italian woman in the village of Alatri referred to as "Cristina", this time performed by Father Gabriele Amorth.

== Cast ==
- Gabriele Amorth
- Robert Barron
- William Friedkin

== Production ==
Mark Kermode, a British film critic and long-time admirer of Friedkin, was invited to assist in writing narration.

== Release ==
The film premiered at the 74th Venice International Film Festival on August 31, 2017. It had a wide release in the United States on April 20, 2018.

== Reception ==
On review aggregator website Rotten Tomatoes, the film holds an approval rating of 44% based on 39 reviews, with an average rating of 4.88/10. The website's critical consensus reads, "The Devil and Father Amorth sets out to interrogate age-old questions of faith, but fails to find enough compelling answers—or reasons for viewers to watch." On Metacritic, the film has a weighted average score of 46 out of 100, based on 16 critics, indicating "mixed or average reviews".

Robbie Collin of The Telegraph wrote that the film "feels amateurish and arguably also exploitative [...] although perhaps that lends it credibility: in this context, too much polish would almost certainly be cause for suspicion." Owen Gleiberman of Variety called the film "a rather tawdry charade." Ignatiy Vishnevetsky of The A.V. Club gave it a C− grade, writing, "Mostly, Friedkin does the talking, never missing an opportunity to strain credulity or flaunt his credentials, which in this case begin and end at directing The Exorcist."
