= Of Exorcisms and Certain Supplications =

Catholic rite of exorcism

Cover page of the book

Of Exorcisms and Certain Supplications (Latin: De Exorcismis et Supplicationibus Quibusdam) is an 84-page document of the Catholic Church containing the current version of the Rite of Exorcism authorised for use in the Latin Church.

== Overview ==
The ritual book was published on 26 January 1999, making it the last liturgical book to be revised following the Second Vatican Council of 1962–1965. The preceding revision of the document was in 1614. A slightly amended edition was issued in 2004.

The document was originally issued only in Latin, but some versions in the vernacular are extant, including an English translation entitled Exorcisms and Related Supplications, which was confirmed by the Vatican in December of 2016.

Depart, then, transgressor. Depart, seducer, full of lies and cunning, foe of virtue, persecutor of the innocent. Give place, abominable creature, give way, you monster, give way to Christ, in whom you found none of your works. For he has already stripped you of your powers and laid waste your kingdom, bound you prisoner and plundered your weapons. He has cast you forth into the outer darkness, where everlasting ruin awaits you and your abettors.

— Partial text of older English version

Following the trends in Catholic approaches to alleged cases of possession since the pontificate of Leo XIII in the 19th century, the new revision includes a warning not to confuse mental illness with demonic possession. It also removes several descriptions of Satan, which sat uncomfortably with the Church's doctrine, and states that the devil is "a spirit without body, without colour and without odour."

The 2004 edition contains two chapters and two appendices.

== Chapter One ==
Title: The Rite of Major Exorcism.

This text is used for the formal ceremony of solemn exorcisms, which are always performed with the express permission of a bishop. It is for use only by mandated priest-exorcists.

== Chapter Two ==
Title: Various texts which may be used ad lib as part of the rite.

This Chapter is subdivided into three sections: a collection of nine psalms with concluding prayers; a collection of five Gospel readings; two pairs of deprecative and imperative formulae of exorcism.

== Appendix One ==
Title: Prayers and exorcism for use in particular circumstances of the church.

An introductory rubric states: The Devil and other demons can not only afflict persons (by temptation and vexation), but also places and objects, and can cause various forms of opposition and persecution of the Church. If the diocesan Bishop, in the particular circumstances, judges it opportune to announce meetings for the faithful to pray, under the guidance and direction of the priest, selected prayers and directives can be taken from the following pages.

Appendix One contains the following liturgy:

- A liturgical greeting.
- An optional liturgy of the Word – reading(s) and homily.
- A collect addressed to the Holy Spirit.
- Optionally, general intercessions concluding with the Lord’s Prayer.
- A statement of purpose.
- An extract from Psalm 68 with congregational response.
- The act of exorcism, first as an deprecative formula, then imperative.
- The Sub tuum prayer and a slightly revised version of an exorcism prayer to St Michael.
- A sprinkling with holy water, blessing and dismissal.

== Appendix Two ==
Title: Prayers which may be used privately by the faithful in the struggle against the powers of darkness.

Appendix Two contains the following (all in Latin):

- Five collect-style prayers to God.
- A short litany of invocations of the Holy Trinity.
- A long litany of invocations of Jesus.
- Short invocations to the Lord with the sign of the Cross.
- Invocations of the Blessed Virgin Mary, including the Sub tuum and Memorare.
- The well-known shorter Prayer to St Michael.
- A short litany of saints.
