= Gabriele Amorth =

Italian Roman Catholic priest and exorcist

The Reverend Gabriele Amorth S.S.P.
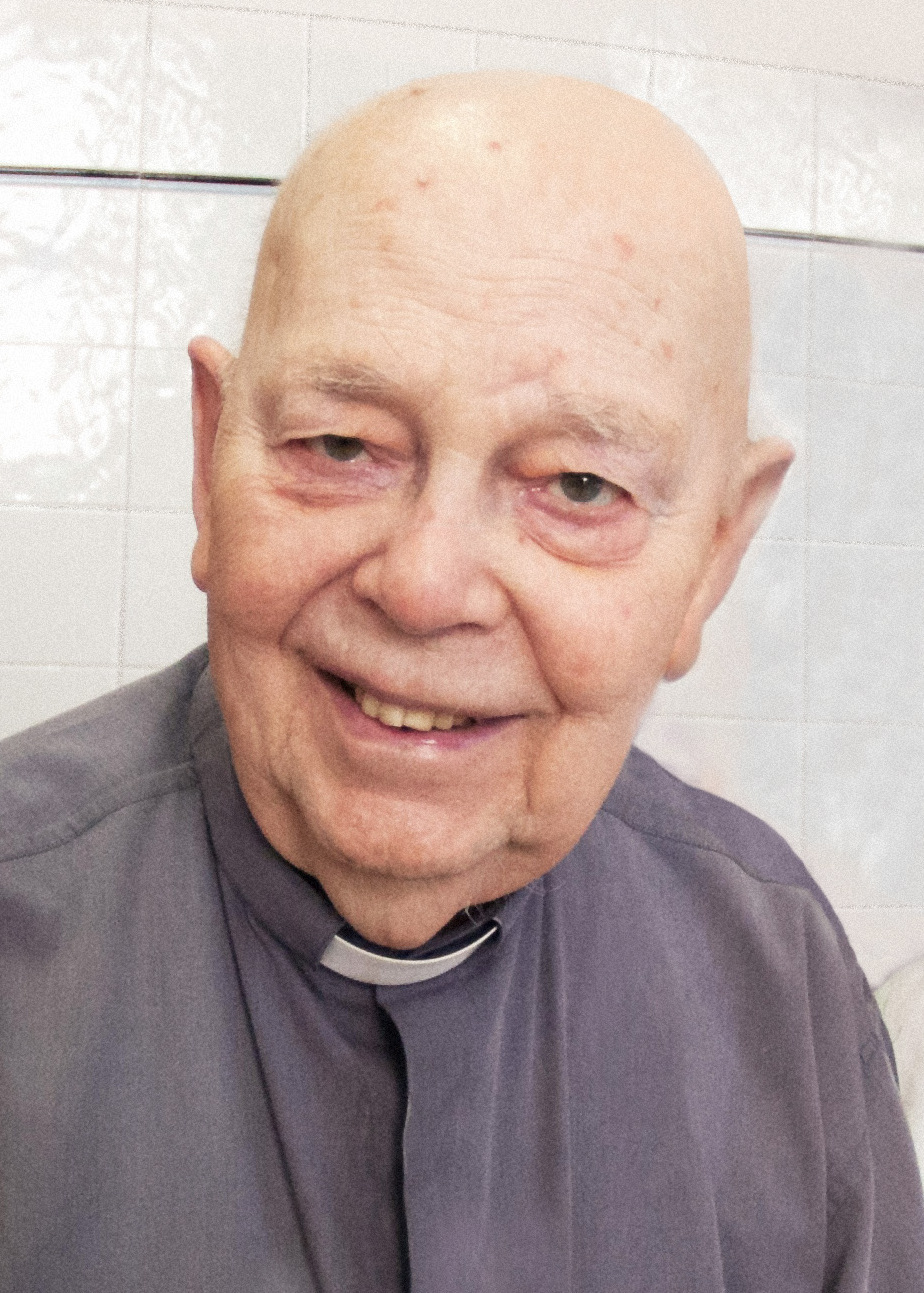
- Fr. Amorth in 2013

Orders
- Ordination: 1954

Personal details
- Born: 1 May 1925 Modena, Italy
- Died: 16 September 2016 (aged 91) Rome, Italy
- Denomination: Catholic
- Occupation: Exorcist and writer

Gabriele Amorth S.S.P. (Italian: [ɡabriˈɛːle ˈaːmort]; 1 May 1925 – 16 September 2016) was an Italian Catholic priest of the Paulines and an exorcist for the Diocese of Rome. Amorth, along with five other priests, founded the International Association of Exorcists.

His work in demonology and Catholic exorcism gained him international recognition. Over the course of his career, Amorth claimed to have performed tens of thousands of exorcisms, at least 60,000, and became one of the most prominent and controversial figures in the Catholic Church in the modern era.

== Biography ==
=== Early life and family ===
Amorth was born in Modena, Emilia-Romagna, Italy, on 1 May 1925 into a family deeply attached to Catholicism and Catholic Action. Both Amorth's father and grandfather were lawyers. His contributions during World War II as a valiant fighter for the Italian resistance movement were followed by his pursuit of legal studies. Additionally, Amorth served as a deputy to Giulio Andreotti, a prominent figure in Italian politics who would later become Prime Minister, within the influential political organization of the Young Christian Democrats.

He was ordained a Roman Catholic priest in 1954. He was appointed an exorcist of the Diocese of Rome in June 1986, under the tutelage of Candido Amantini. He was a member of the Society of St. Paul, the congregation founded by Giacomo Alberione in 1914. In 1990, he founded the International Association of Exorcists and was president until his retirement in 2000.

=== Exorcisms ===
In October 2000, it was reported he had performed over 50,000 exorcisms (which ranged from "a few minutes" to "several hours" in length). In March 2010, he said the number had increased to 70,000. By May 2013, he said he had performed 160,000 exorcisms in the course of his ministry. According to Amorth, each exorcism does not represent a victim of possession, but rather each exorcism is counted as a prayer or ritual alone; some possessed victims required hundreds of exorcisms.

Edward Peters, a professor of canon law, finds Amorth's claim to have personally performed 30,000 exorcisms over nine years "astounding". Even accepting Amorth's claim that only 94 of his 30,000 exorcisms represented full-blown possession, that would have required roughly one case a month to be thoroughly examined and processed over nine years with hardly a break.

To account for the high number, Amorth purported that a person might be possessed by more than one demon at once, sometimes numbering in the thousands. He also attributed the number of exorcisms performed to his opinion that "People have lost the Faith, and superstition, magic, Satanism, or ouija boards have taken its place, which then open all the doors to the presence of demons."

When asked whether the devil can strike inside the Vatican City, Amorth stated, "He has tried already. He did it in 1981 by attacking John Paul II by working with those who armed Ali Ağca."

According to Amorth, the Catholic Church sexual abuse cases were the result of the work of demons on some priests, who "were not possessed, but rather tempted by the devil."

Amorth offered the following guidelines to those exercising the charism of exorcism. Any such person must be highly regarded for their prayer life, faith, acts of charity, and judgement. In addition, he must rely solely on the "Word of God" and traditional prayer, be completely detached from monetary concerns, be profoundly humble, and treasure obscurity.

The Vatican last codified the rites of exorcism in 2004 in an updated Latin-language document, De Exorcismis et Supplicationibus Quibusdam.

=== Death ===
Amorth died at the age of 91 on September 16, 2016, a short time after he was hospitalised for pulmonary complications.

== Books ==
Amorth wrote two memoirs of his time as an exorcist: An Exorcist Tells His Story and An Exorcist: More Stories. The books include references to the official Roman Catholic teachings on demonology while the main emphasis is on Amorth's experience as an exorcist. Both include references to the diagnosis and treatment of spiritual problems. The books briefly cover the topics of demonic contraction and curses. He states, "A curse can originate from such things as maledictions by close relatives, a habit of blaspheming, membership in Freemasonry, spiritic or magic practices, and so on."

Amorth wrote more than thirty books in Italian, many of which have been translated into other languages. The following are his books in English:

- An Exorcist Tells His Story – published on March 1, 1999, by Ignatius Press (translated by Nicoletta V. MacKenzie, and originally published as Un esorcista racconta, Roma, Dehoniane, 1990).
- An Exorcist: More Stories – published on February 1, 2002, by Ignatius Press (translated by Nicoletta V. MacKenzie, and originally published as Nuovi racconti di un esorcista, Roma, Dehoniane, 1992).
- An Exorcist Explains the Demonic: The Antics of Satan and His Army of Fallen Angels – published on October 20, 2016, by Sophia Press
- The Devil is Afraid of Me: The Life and Work of the World's Most Famous Exorcist, with Marcello Stanzione – published 2019, by Sophia Institute Press. Translated by Charlotte J. Fasi (originally published as Il Diavolo Ha Paura di Me, Tavagnacco: Edizioni Segno, 2016.
- Amorth: My Battle Against Satan, interviewed by Elisabetta Fezzi, translated by Charlotte J. Fasi – published on November 15, 2018 by Sophia Institute Press (originally published as Padre Amorth: La mia battaglia con Dio contro Satana, Milan: Edizioni San Paolo, September 2017.
- Father Gabriele Amorth: The Official Biography of the Pope's Exorcist (Fr. Gabriele Amorth: Rome's Exorcist, The Official Biography), by Domenico Agasso, Gastonia: TAN Books, 2023. Translated by Bret Thoman, OFS (Originally published as Don Amorth continua: La biografia ufficiale, Milan: Edizioni San Paolo, August 2021. 240 pages.)
- The Pope's Exorcist: 101 Questions about Fr. Gabriele Amorth, Manchester: Sophia Institute Press, 2022. 112 pages.

Amorth was also interviewed for the second episode of True Horror with Anthony Head, presented by Anthony Head. He explained he would never perform an exorcism based solely on someone's claims of possession; he always directs people to psychiatrists and doctors first, and that when he sees someone is not possessed, but the person still insists, he replies: "You have no devil. If you have a problem, talk to a good vet."

== In film ==
The 2017 American documentary film The Devil and Father Amorth, directed by William Friedkin, presents the exorcist at work in an Italian village.

Russell Crowe portrays Amorth in the 2023 supernatural horror film The Pope's Exorcist, very loosely based on the priest's two memoirs.

== Views ==
=== Yoga ===
At a film festival in Umbria (where he was invited to introduce the 2011 film about Exorcism called The Rite), he is quoted as saying that yoga is satanic because it leads to the practice of Hinduism, Buddhism and "all eastern religions are based on a false belief in reincarnation" and "practicing yoga is satanic, it leads to evil just like reading Harry Potter."

=== Disappearance of Emanuela Orlandi ===
Amorth claimed that Emanuela Orlandi, a Vatican City schoolgirl who went missing in Rome in 1983, was kidnapped for a sex party by a gang involving Vatican police and foreign diplomats. He said that she was later murdered and her body disposed of. Amorth claimed that girls were recruited at the Vatican for parties, adding that her death "was a crime with a sexual motive."

As of 2026, Emanuela Orlandi's disappearance remains unsolved.

== Bibliography ==
- An Exorcist Tells his Story (translated by Nicoletta V. Mackenzie), 1999.
- Gospel of Mary: A Month With the Mother of God, 2000.
- An Exorcist: More Stories (translated by Nicoletta V. Mackenzie), 2002.
- Esorcisti e Psichiatri, 2002.
- Pater Pio: Lebensgeschichte eines Heiligen, 2003.
- Dietro un sorriso: Beata Alexandrina Maria da Costa, Elledici, 2006.
- Memorie di un esorcista, 2010.
- An Exorcist Explains the Demonic (with Stefano Stimamiglio, translated by Charlotte J. Fasi), 2016.
