= Exorcist =

Person who is believed to be able to cast out the devil or other demons

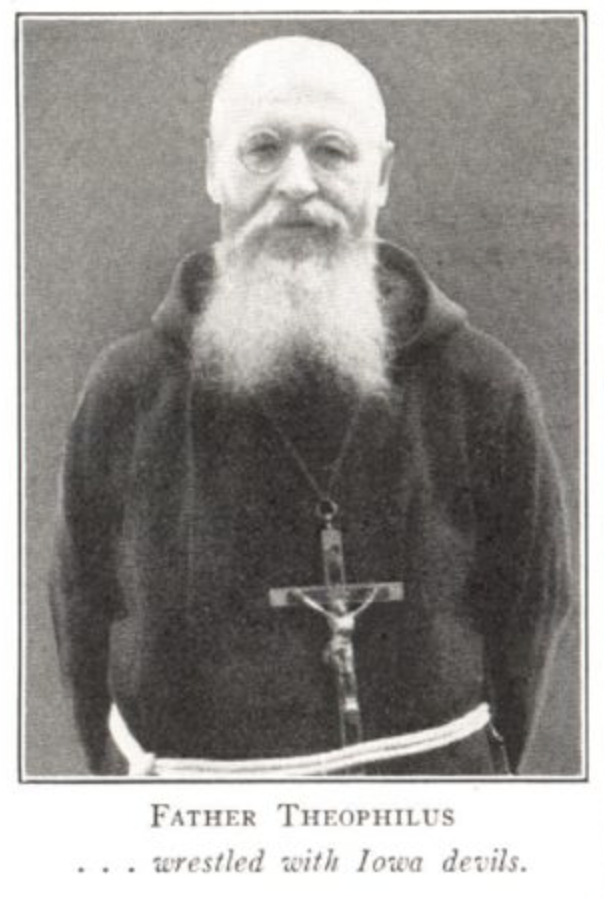
A portrait of Theophilus Riesinger taken for Time Magazine's 1936 issue on the Earling Exorcism. A caption below reads "Father Theophilus... wrestled with Iowa devils."

In some religions, an exorcist (from the Greek „ἐξορκιστής“) is a person who is believed to be able to cast out the devil or performs the ridding of demons or other supernatural beings who are alleged to have possessed a person, or (sometimes) a building or object. An exorcist can be a specially prepared or instructed person including: a priest, a nun, a monk, a witch doctor (healer), a shaman, a psychic or a geomancer (feng shui – Chinese geomancy).

== Exorcists in various religions ==
=== Christianity ===
In Christianity, exorcisms are a rite used to cast out demons from individuals deemed possessed. In training exorcists, ecumenical collaboration between Christians of various traditions, such as the Roman Catholic, the Lutheran and the Anglican denominations has occurred, as with a May 2019 exorcists' conference in Rome.

==== Catholicism ====
In a Roman Catholic context, exorcist may refer to a cleric who has been ordained into the minor order of exorcist, or a priest who has been mandated to perform the rite of solemn exorcism.

===== Minor order of exorcist =====
Since at least the third century, the Latin Church has formally ordained men to the minor order of exorcist. Text previously attributed to a fourth Council of Carthage (398), now identified as a collection called Statuta Ecclesiæ Antiqua, prescribes in its seventh canon the rite of ordination of such an exorcist: the bishop is to give him the book containing the formulae of exorcism, saying, "Receive, and commit to memory, and possess the power of imposing hands on energumens, whether baptized or catechumens".

These exorcists routinely performed ceremonies over adults and infants preparatory to baptism. Authors such as Eusebius (3rd century) and Augustine (4th century) provide details of these minor exorcisms: Eusebius mentions the imposition of hands and prayer. Augustine noted that rites of exorcism by exsufflation (breathing upon the candidate) were also performed for the baptism of infants.

The office of Exorcist was not a part of the sacrament of Holy Orders but as a sacramental was instead first conferred on those who had the special charism to perform its duties and later to those studying for the priesthood. As a minor order, exorcists wore the surplice.

In 1972, the minor orders were reformed; men preparing to be ordained as Catholic priests or deacons would no longer receive the minor order of exorcist; the minor orders of lector and acolyte were retained, but redesignated as ministries. It was left open to the Catholic bishops of individual countries to petition the Vatican to establish a ministry of exorcist if it seemed useful in that nation.

The rite of conferral continues in societies that use the 1962 (or earlier) form of the Roman Rite, such as the Priestly Fraternity of St Peter, Society of St. Pius X, and also among groups not in communion with the current bishop of Rome, such as the Society of St Pius V. Some believe that attainment of the position of Acolyte in post-Council practices implies ordination to the minor orders which used to be below it, such as Exorcist and Porter, although this has not been officially defined (although Canon Law section 1009 does specifically state that the only "orders are the episcopate, the priesthood and the diaconate").

The Eastern Churches did not establish a minor order of exorcist, but simply recognised the calling of lay or ordained members of the faithful who had the appropriate spiritual gifts. In principle, every Christian has the power to command demons and drive them out in the name of Christ.

===== Mandated Exorcists =====
The Catechism of the Catholic Church states that: "Jesus performed exorcisms and from him the Church has received the power and office of exorcizing". The 1917 Code of Canon Law explicitly stated that the solemn exorcism of a person believed to be possessed may only be performed with the express authorisation of the local bishop or equivalent; "this permission is only to be given to priests of the highest repute". The revised 1983 Code of Canon Law similarly stated that the bishop is "to give this permission only to a presbyter who has piety, knowledge, prudence, and integrity of life."

The Catholic Church's Rite of Exorcism was revised in 1999. Paragraph 13 of its introduction states that a priest can be appointed by the local Bishop either for a single act of exorcism, or to the permanent position of 'exorcist'. The Rite then specifies that whenever it uses the word exorcist without qualification, it indicates a priest mandated in this way.

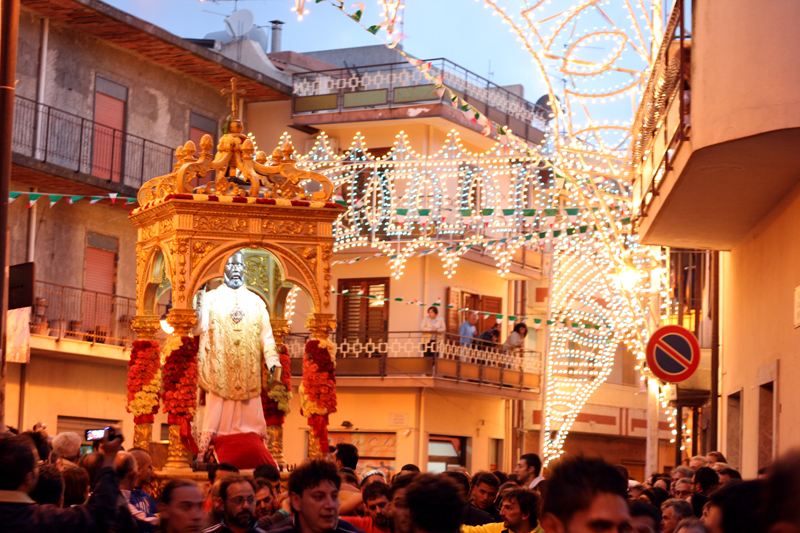
Saint Philip of Agira with the Gospel in his left hand, the symbol of the exorcists, in the May celebrations in his honor at Limina, Sicily

Among notable exorcists, Gabriele Amorth served as chief exorcist of the Diocese of Rome; he was the founder of the International Association of Exorcists.

American exorcists whom have been featured on podcasts include Fr. Carlos Martins and Fr. Vincent Lampert. Fr. Carlos Martins stated that “1 confession is more powerful than 1,000 exorcisms” and Fr. Vincent Lampert also stated that only 1 out of every 5,000 inquiries for those seeking an exorcism were an actual case of demonic possession.

==== Lutheranism ====
In Lutheranism, exorcists practice the "extensive ministry of casting out evil spirits ... in the name of Christ." In Madagascar, where the Malagasy Lutheran Church has territorial jurisdiction, the demand for exorcisms is quite high and pastors from sister Lutheran Churches, such as the Lutheran Church–Missouri Synod have brought the education they gleaned while training in Madagascar back to the United States.

==== Anglicanism ====
In the Church of England, mother Church of the Anglican Communion, every diocese has an exorcist.

=== Hinduism ===
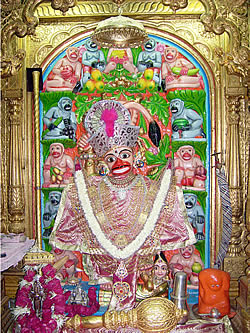
The image of Hanuman at the Hanuman temple in Sarangpur is said to be so powerful that its gaze drives evil spirits out of victims.

Beliefs and practices pertaining to the practice of exorcism are prominently connected with the ancient Dravidians in the south. Of the four Vedas (holy books of the Hindus), the Atharva Veda is said to contain the secrets related to magic and medicine. Many of the rituals described in this book are for casting out demons and evil spirits. These beliefs are particularly strong and practiced in West Bengal, Odisha and southern states like Kerala.

Vaishnava traditions also employ a recitation of names of Lord Narasimha and reading scriptures (notably Bhagavata Purana) aloud. According to Gita Mahatmya of Padma Purana, reading the 3rd, 7th and 8th chapter of Bhagavad Gita and mentally offering the result to departed persons helps them to get released from their ghostly situation. Kirtan, continuous playing of mantras, keeping scriptures and holy pictures of the deities (Shiva, Vishnu, Brahma, Shakti etc. but especially of Narasimha) in the house, burning incense offered during a puja, sprinkling water from holy rivers, and blowing conches used in puja are other effective practices.

The main Puranic resource on ghost- and death-related topics is Garuda Purana.

== See also ==
- Celestial Masters
- Demon hunter
- Exorcism
- Fashi
- Parapsychology
- Fangxiangshi, a Chinese ritual exorcist
