= Saint Michael in the Catholic Church =

Catholic saint

Victory of St. Michael by Raphael, 16th century

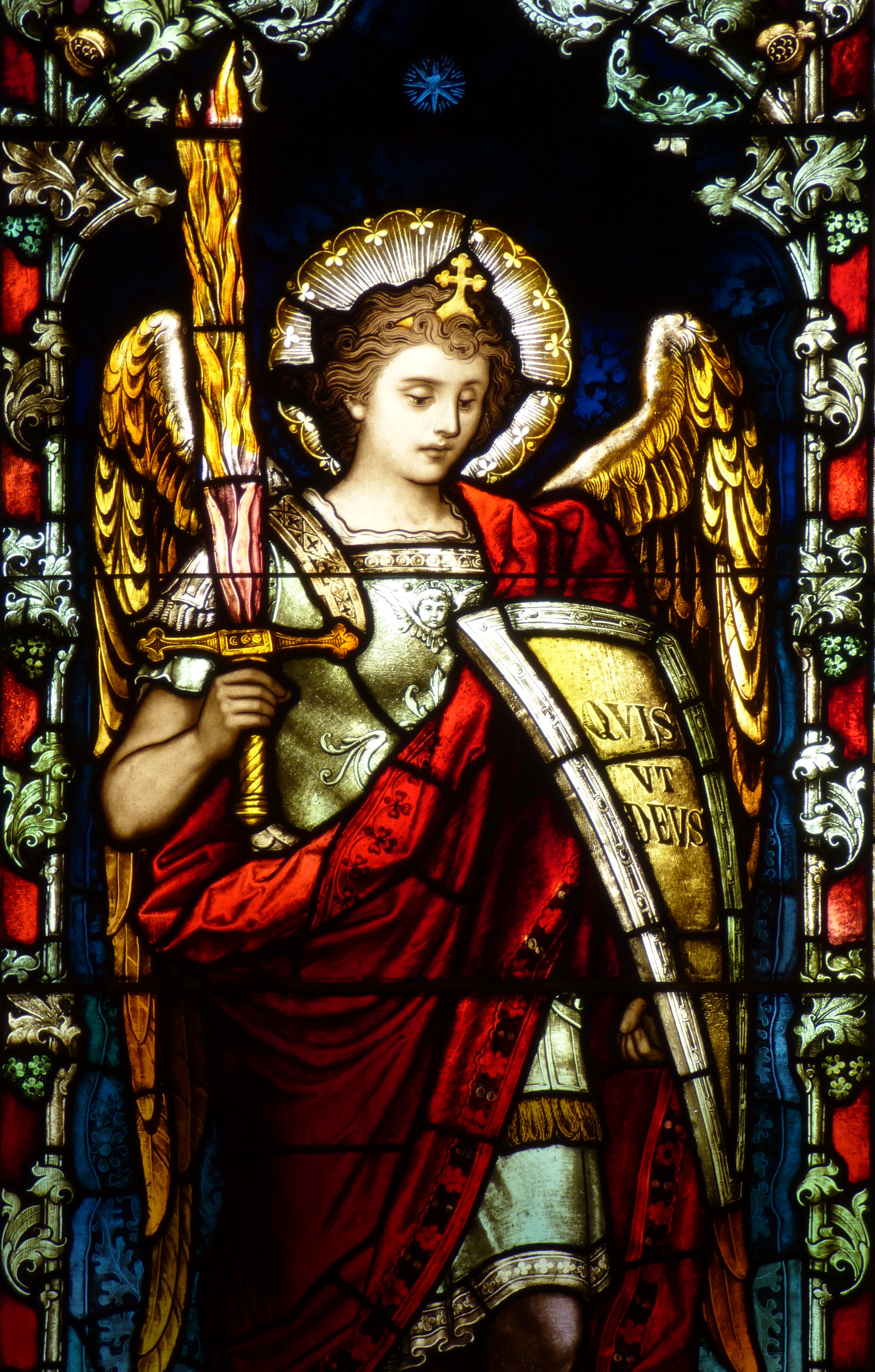
St. Michael in stained glass window by Franz Mayer & Co. Quis ut Deus? ('Who is like God?') is on his shield.

Saint Michael the Archangel is referenced in the Old Testament and has been part of Christian teachings since the earliest times. In Catholic writings and traditions, he acts as the defender of the Church and the opponent of Satan. He also assists people at the hour of death.

A widely used "Prayer to Saint Michael" was brought into official use by Pope Leo XIII in 1886 and was recommended by Pope John Paul II in 1994.

== In scripture ==
Michael is mentioned by name five times in the Bible.

- Daniel 10:13, Gabriel says, "...but the prince of the kingdom of Persia stood in my way for twenty-one days, until finally Michael, one of the chief princes, came to help me."
- Daniel 10:21, "No one supports me against all these except Michael, your prince, standing as a reinforcement and a bulwark for me."
- Daniel 12:1, "At that time there shall arise Michael, the great prince, guardian of your people; It shall be a time unsurpassed in distress since nations began until that time."
- Jude 1:9, "Yet the archangel Michael, when he argued with the devil in a dispute over the body of Moses, did not venture to pronounce a reviling judgment upon him but said, 'May the Lord rebuke you!'"
- Revelation 12:7–9, "Then war broke out in heaven; Michael and his angels battled against the dragon. The dragon and his angels fought back, but they did not prevail and there was no longer any place for them in heaven. The huge dragon, the ancient serpent, who is called the Devil and Satan, who deceived the whole world, was thrown down to earth, and his angels were thrown down with him."

== Michael and the Archangels ==
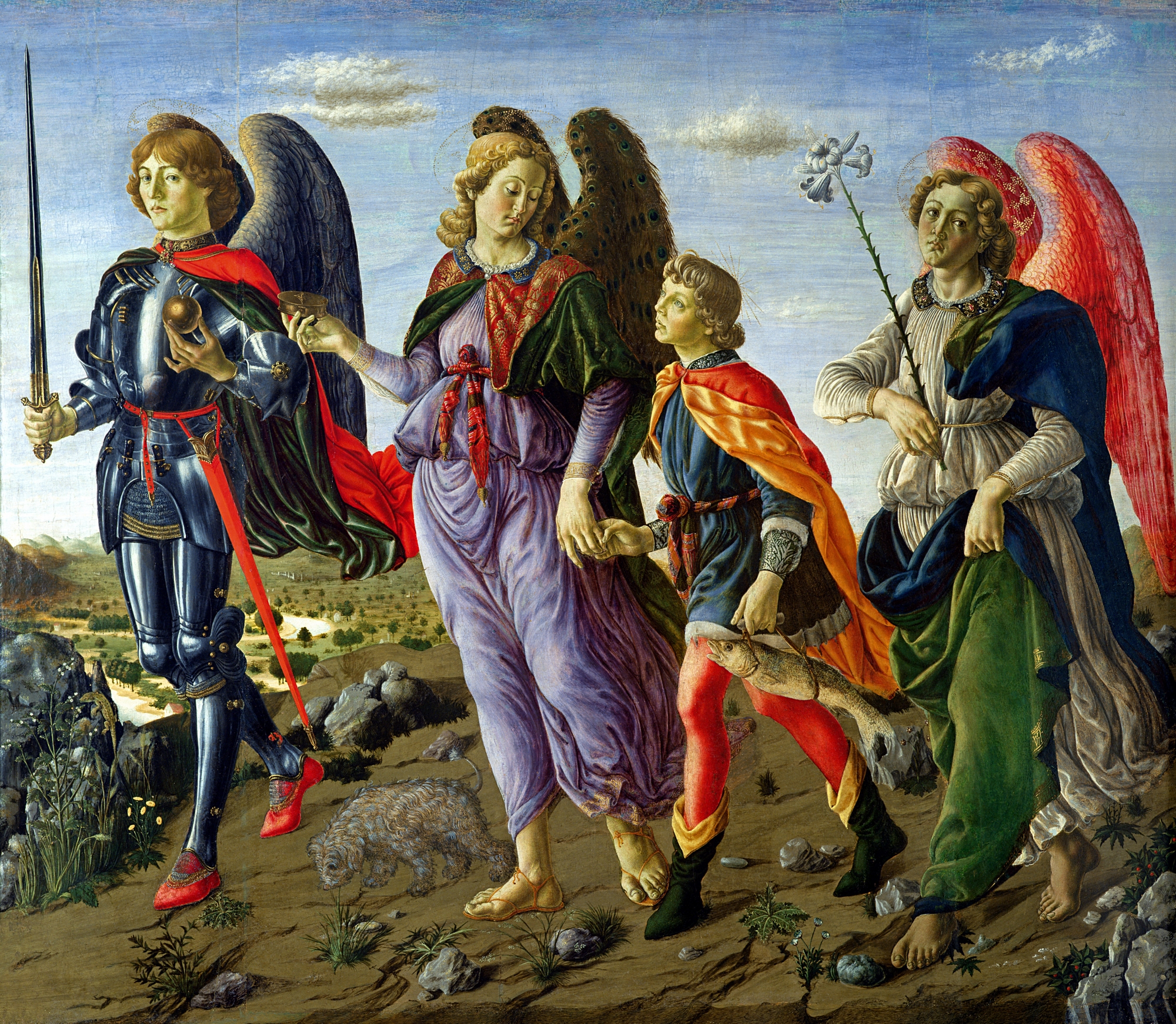
Archangel Michael with archangels Raphael and Gabriel, as they accompany Tobias, by Francesco Botticini, 1470

Catholic tradition calls Michael, Gabriel and Raphael archangels. The word archangel comes from the Greek words arche (prince) and angelos (messenger). Michael means "Who is like God?" (a rhetorical question), Gabriel means "Power of God" or "Strong One of God" and Raphael means "God has healed". Michael, Gabriel, and Raphael are named in the Bible as angels. (Catholic and Eastern Orthodox Christians accept as canonical the Book of Tobit, in which Raphael is named.) Only Michael is called an archangel in the Bible. The feast of these angels is celebrated on September 29. In addition to these three Archangels, the Eastern Catholic Churches also venerate Uriel, Selaphiel, Jegudiel, Barachiel and Jerahmeel. The Synaxis of the Holy Archangels is on November 8.

Traditionally, seven Angels were considered to be of special significance, who stand before the Throne of God. Within the hierarchy of the angels, at the highest level, St. Michael is a princely seraph, an angel of supreme power and the leader of God's army.

Christian art often portrays archangels together. Archangels Michael and Gabriel are jointly depicted on Our Lady of Perpetual Help, a Byzantine icon of the Blessed Virgin Mary that has been the subject of widespread Catholic devotions for centuries.

== Role and mission ==
In Roman Catholicism, Saint Michael has four distinct roles. First, he is the Enemy of Satan and the fallen angels. He defeated Satan and ejected him from Paradise and will achieve victory at the hour of the final battle with Satan. Secondly, he is the Christian angel of death: at the hour of death, Saint Michael descends and gives each person the chance to redeem oneself before passing. Saint Michael's third role is weighing peoples' merits (hence the saint is often depicted holding scales) on Judgment Day. And finally, Saint Michael is the Guardian of the Church.

=== Defeat of Satan and the fallen angels ===
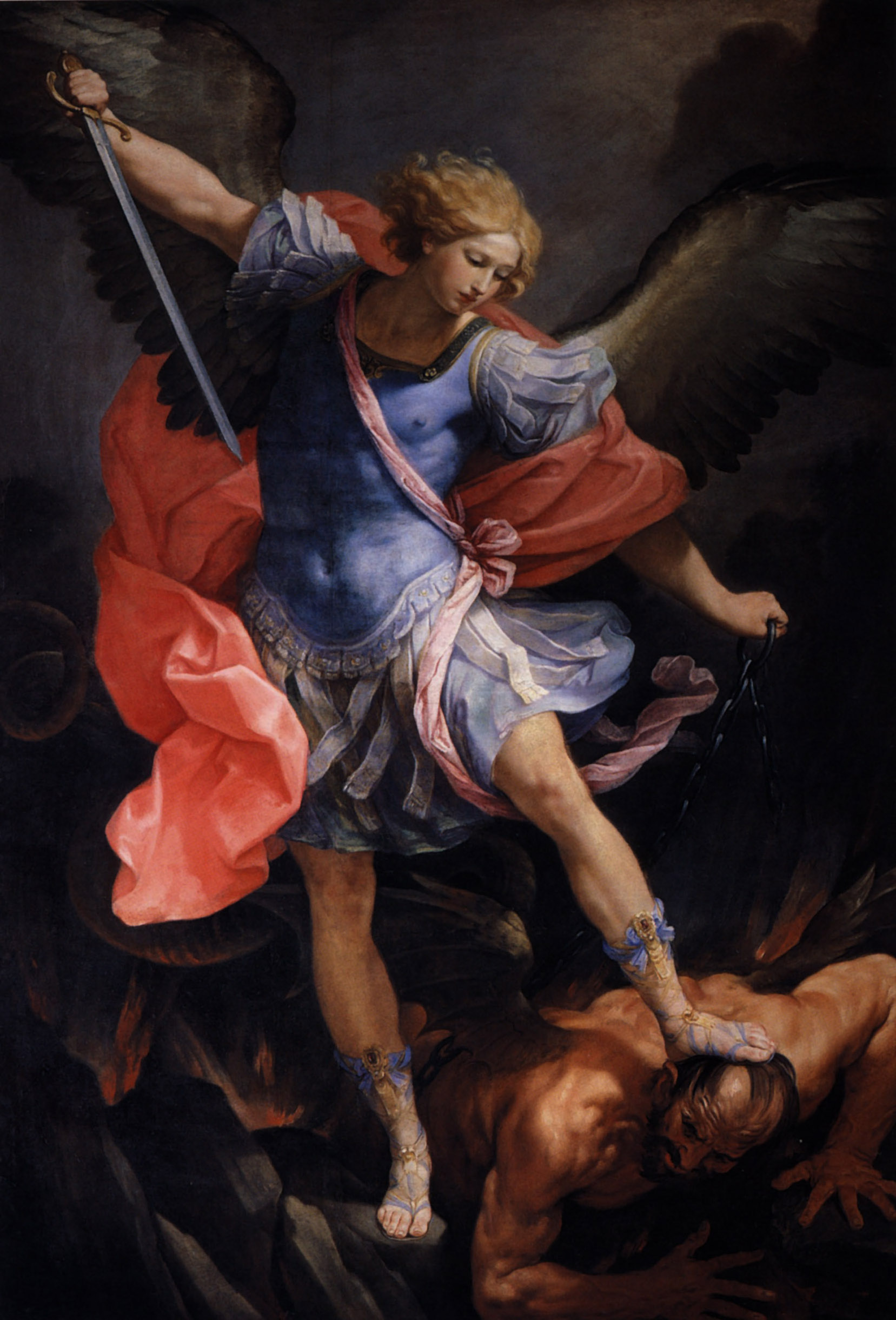
Guido Reni's painting in Santa Maria della Concezione, Rome, 1636 is also reproduced in mosaic at the St. Michael Altar in St. Peter's Basilica, in the Vatican.

Saint Michael is viewed as the commander of the Army of God. From the time of the apostles, he has been invoked and honored as the protector of the Church. Scripture describes him as "one of the chief princes" and the leader of heaven's forces in their triumph over the powers of hell.

Saint Michael defeats Satan on two occasions, first when he ejects him from Paradise, and secondly in the final battle of the end times when the Antichrist will be defeated by him. Noted hagiographer Alban Butler, defined the role of Saint Michael: "Who is like God?" was the cry of Archangel Michael when he smote the rebel Lucifer in the conflict of the heavenly hosts. And when Antichrist shall have set up his kingdom on earth, it is St Michael who will unfurl once more the standard of the cross, sound the last trumpet, bind together the false prophet and the beast and hurl them for all eternity into the burning pool.

Saint Michael is the traditional prototype of the spiritual warrior, a paradigm extended to other warrior saints. This conflict against evil may at times be viewed as an interior battle. The concept of the warrior saint has extended to other Catholic saints, beginning with examples such as Saint George and Saint Theodore of Amasea.

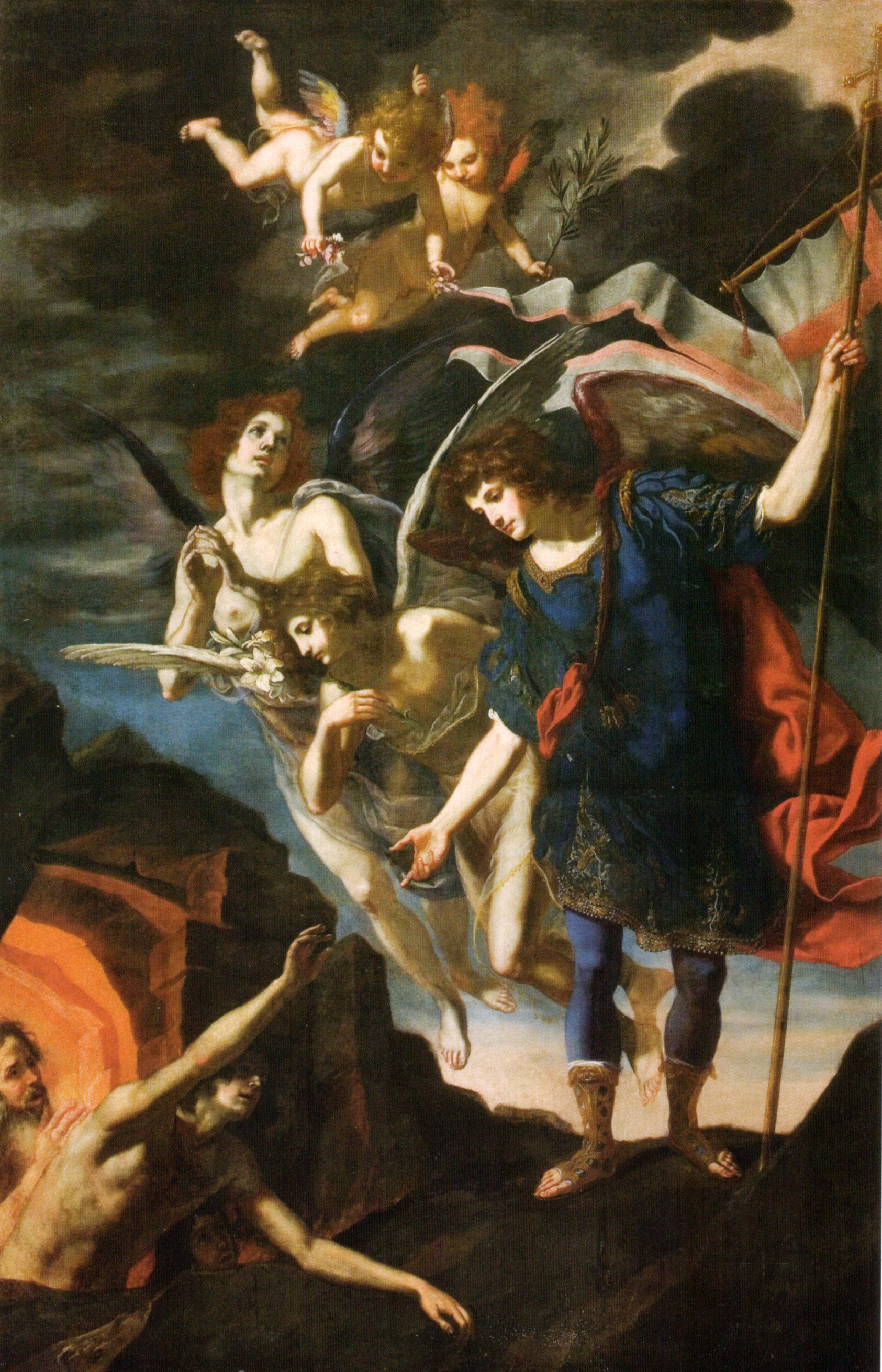
Archangel Michael saving persons from purgatory, by Jacopo Vignali, 17th century

=== At the hour of death ===
Saint Michael is one of the angels presumed present at the hour of death. Traditionally, he is charged to assist the dying and accompany them to their particular judgment, where he serves as an advocate. Cemetery chapels are often dedicated to him, where Masses are offered in his honor on behalf of the departed.

=== Weighing souls on Judgment Day ===
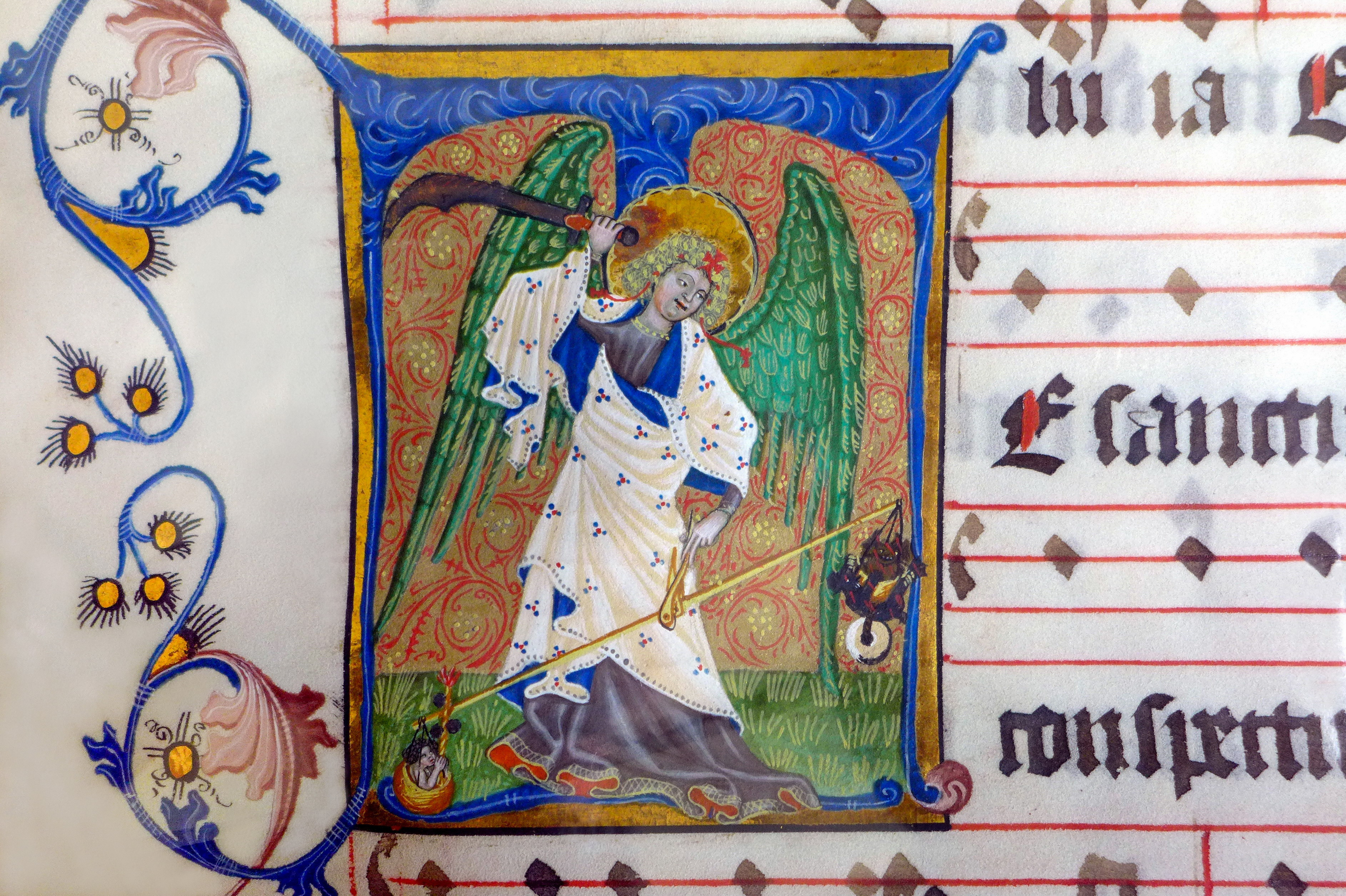
St. Michael weighing souls during the Last Judgement, Antiphonale Cisterciense (15th century), Abbey Bibliotheca, Rein Abbey, Austria

In Catholic tradition, on Judgment Day Saint Michael weighs souls based on their deeds during their life on earth. Saint Michael is often portrayed in art with scales. This role of Saint Michael was depicted by Michelangelo on the ceiling of the Sistine Chapel. In this depiction, angels hold up two books: the smaller book held by Saint Michael records the names of the blessed, while the larger book is a list of the damned.

=== Guardian of the Church ===
The tradition of Michael as prince-protector of the Jewish people was adopted by the Christian Church. Saint Michael has long been recognized as the protector and guardian of the Church itself and the angel of the Blessed Sacrament. In a 2007 address Pope Benedict XVI urged the bishops he was ordaining to take Michael as a model in making room in the world for God, countering denials of him and thus defending humankind's greatness, and in acting as "true guardian angels" of the Church. Saint Michael is also the guardian angel of the pope and has been invoked as the patron and guardian angel of many countries as well as specific professions.

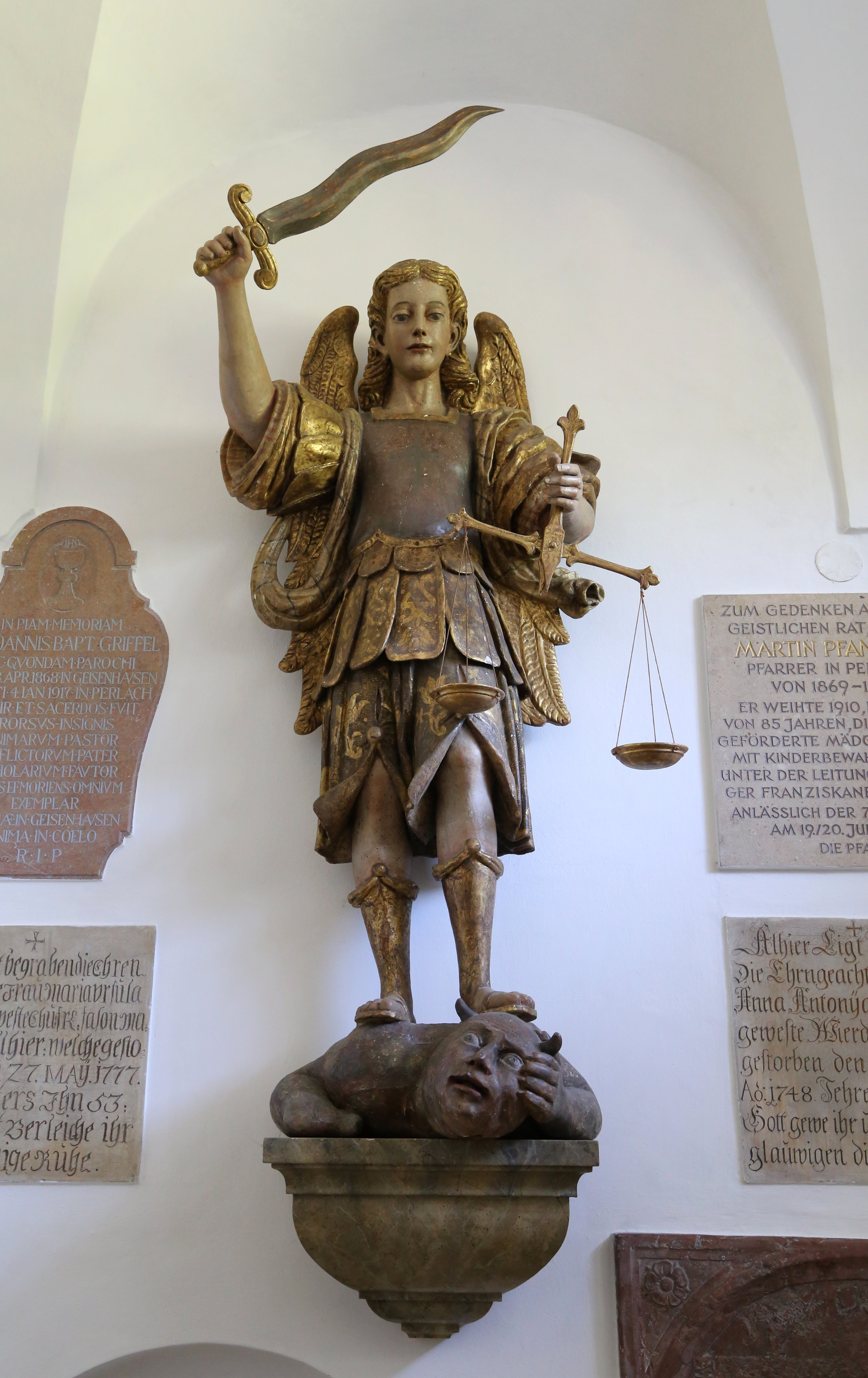
St. Michael

== Cultus ==
"Of all the angels, Michael was by far the most important in the Middle Ages." The earliest indications of a cult of St. Michael occur in the Near East. The emperor Constantine built the Michaelion at Chalcedon on the site of an earlier temple. Other sanctuaries were located at healing springs in Anatolia, Antioch, and Egypt. Identification of St Michael with the gift of healing can be seen in Gregory the Great leading a devotional procession in 590 when the city of Rome was afflicted with a plague that killed his predecessor. Gregory reportedly saw a vision of Saint Michael atop the Mausoleum of Hadrian. The archangel sheathed his sword, suggesting to the pope that the peril was ended. He subsequently renamed the Mausoleum Castel Sant'Angelo (Castle of the Holy Angel) in honor of St. Michael.

The Visio Sancti Pauli, written in the late fourth or early fifth century, presents St Michael as an advocate for sinners, guarantor of rain, and thus a patron of agriculture. The Greek, Syrian, and Coptic Churches had venerated St. Michael since at least the early sixth century. The cult of St. Michael was widespread in the British Isles during the Middle Ages.

Legends include a number of reported appearances of Saint Michael, where sanctuaries or churches were later built or dedicated to him. These include Monte Gargano in Italy early in the 6th century where the Sanctuary of Monte Sant'Angelo, the oldest shrine in Western Europe, is dedicated to Saint Michael. Early in the 8th century, Saint Michael reportedly appeared three times to Saint Aubert, the bishop of Avranches in Normandy, France, and instructed him to build a church on the small island now known as Mont Saint-Michel. Several healings were reported when the church was being built and Mont Saint-Michel still remains a Catholic pilgrimage site.

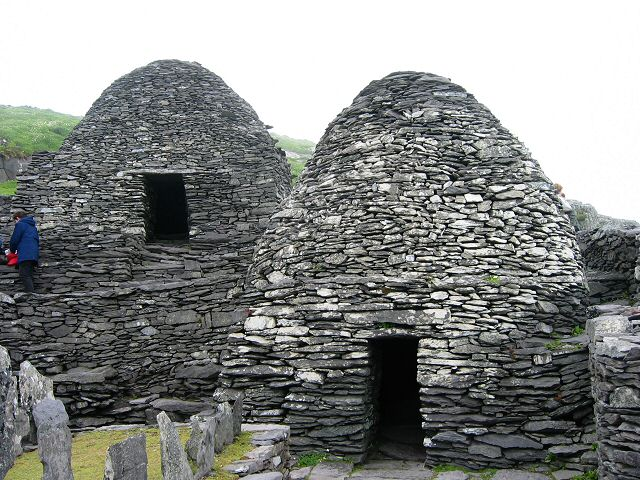
Skellig Michael

The role of Saint Michael as protector and guardian has also led to the design of statues that depict him, and the construction of Churches and monasteries at specific locations. Because most monastic islands lie close to land, they were viewed as forts holding demons at a distance against attacks on the Church. Monasteries such as Mont Saint-Michel off the coast of Normandy, France, and Skellig Michael, off the coast of County Kerry, Ireland, dedicated to the Archangel are examples of these. Another notable structure is that of St Michael's Mount, located in Mounts Bay, near Penzance, Cornwall – a stunning island castle that resembles Mont Saint-Michel, and can only be reached on foot at low tide.

St. Bernard of Clairvaux recommended the invocation of Saint Michael at times of temptation and sorrow: "Whenever any grievous temptation or vehement sorrow oppresses thee, invoke thy guardian, thy leader, cry out to him, and say, 'Lord, save us, lest we perish!'"

St. Francis of Assisi was especially devoted to Saint Michael and would fast for about forty days from the feast of the Assumption (August 15) to Saint Michael's feast day on September 29. Some Franciscan communities continue to observe the period from August 15 to September 29 as "St. Michael's Lent", a time of fasting and prayer.

Michael the Archangel by Jaime Huguet, 1456

== Mentions in the Tridentine liturgy ==
In editions of the Roman Missal before 1970, Saint Michael was mentioned in the Confiteor as recited by the priest and again in the altar server's response at Mass. He was mentioned also in celebrations of Solemn Mass when the priest put incense in the thurible, reciting the prayer: Per intercessionem beati Michaelis Archangeli, stantis a dextris altaris incensi, et omnium electorum suorum, incensum istud dignetur Dominus benedicere, et in odorem suavitatis accipere. Per Christum Dominum nostrum. Amen. (Through the intercession of Blessed Michael the Archangel, standing at the right hand of the altar of incense, and of all his elect, may the Lord kindly bless this incense and accept it as a savour of sweetness).

Until Pope John XXIII revised it in 1960, the General Roman Calendar had not one but two feasts of Saint Michael, one on 29 September, the other on 8 May, each commemorating distinct events. The May 8th feast commemorates the Apparition of Saint Michael at Mount Gargano, while the September 29th feast commemorates the Dedication of the Basilica of St. Michael in Rome.

== Veneration ==
=== Patronage ===
Because of his association with scales to judge the souls of the dead, Michael the Archangel is the patron saint of bankers and grocers. Additionally, because of his role in leading the angels to expel Satan from heaven, Saint Michael is also the patron saint of police officers and military personnel.

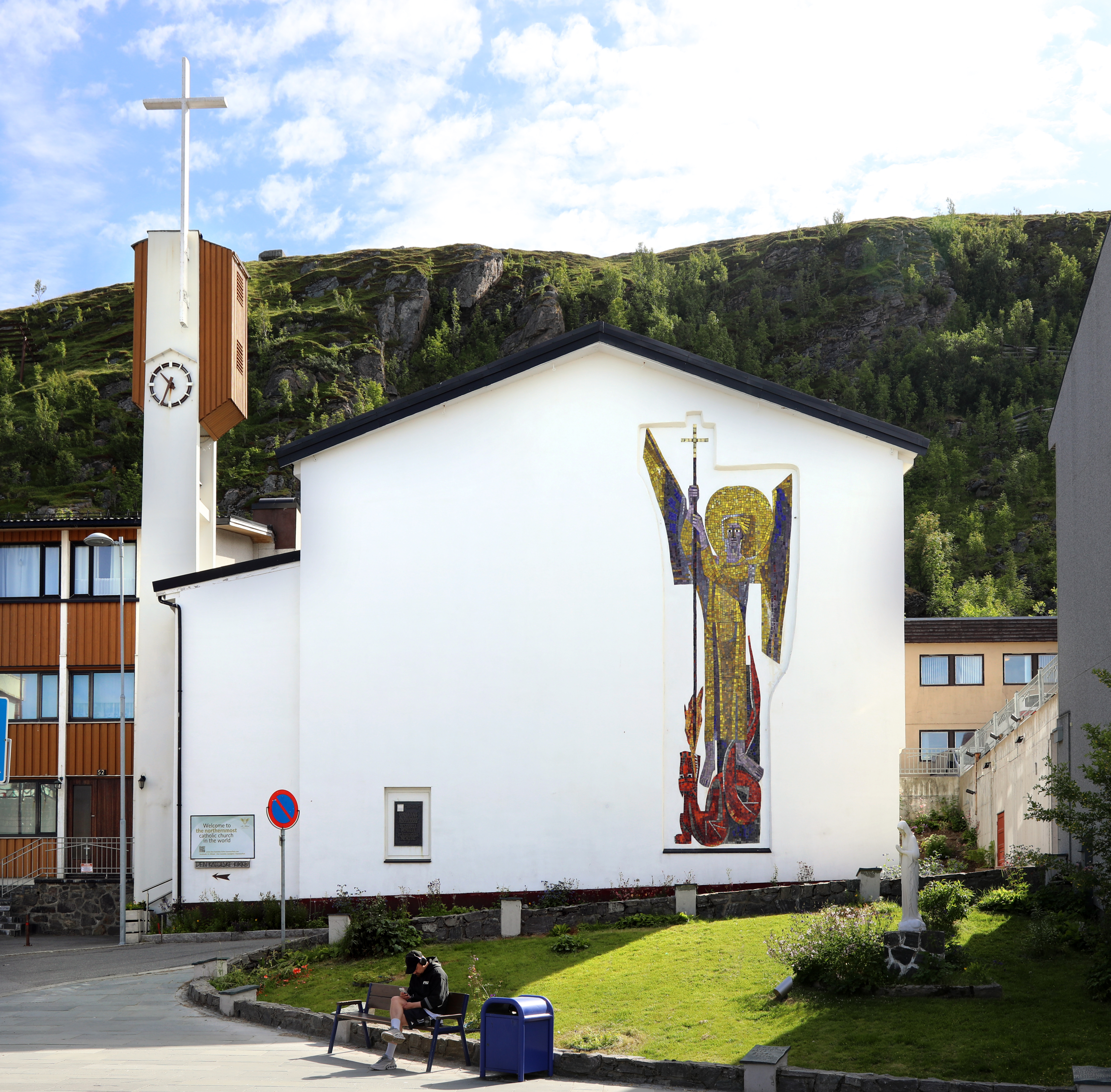
St. Michael's church in Hammerfest, Norway, the northernmost Catholic church in the world

A large number of Roman Catholic churches around the globe are dedicated to Saint Michael, from Hammerfest, Norway, to Oeste Catarinense in Brazil. Saint Michael's feast day of September 29 has been solemnly celebrated in many locations since the fifth century. And many churches that honor Saint Michael are dedicated on the 29th of September, e.g., Pope Boniface IV dedicated Saint Michael's Church in Rome on that day in 610.

== Devotions ==
Devotions to Saint Michael have a large Catholic following, and a number of churches are dedicated to him worldwide. Roman Catholic devotions to Saint Michael have been expressed in a variety of forms, including a chaplet and scapular. A number of prayers, novenas, and hymns are directed to him.

=== Prayers ===
The familiar Prayer to Saint Michael reads:

"Saint Michael the archangel, defend us in battle. Be our protection against the wickedness and snares of the Devil. May God rebuke him, we humbly pray, and do thou, O Prince of the Heavenly hosts, by the power of God, cast into Hell Satan, and all the evil spirits who prowl about the world, seeking the ruin of souls. Amen."

Pope Leo XIII added a Prayer to Saint Michael to the Leonine Prayers in 1886. Although these prayers are no longer recited after Mass, as they were until 1964, Pope John Paul II encouraged the Catholic faithful to continue to pray it, saying: "I ask everyone not to forget it and to recite it to obtain help in the battle against forces of darkness." Like any other novena, the novenas to Saint Michael are prayed on nine consecutive days.

A prayer to St. Michael for protection is found in the Carmina Gadelica, collected by Alexander Carmichael in the Gaelic-speaking regions of Scotland.

O Michael of the Angels
and the righteous in heaven,
Shield thou my soul
With the shade of thy sword.
Shield thou my soul
On earth and in heaven.

From foes upon earth,
From foes beneath earth,
From foes in concealment,
Protect and encircle
My soul 'neath thy wing,
O my soul with the shade of thy wing.

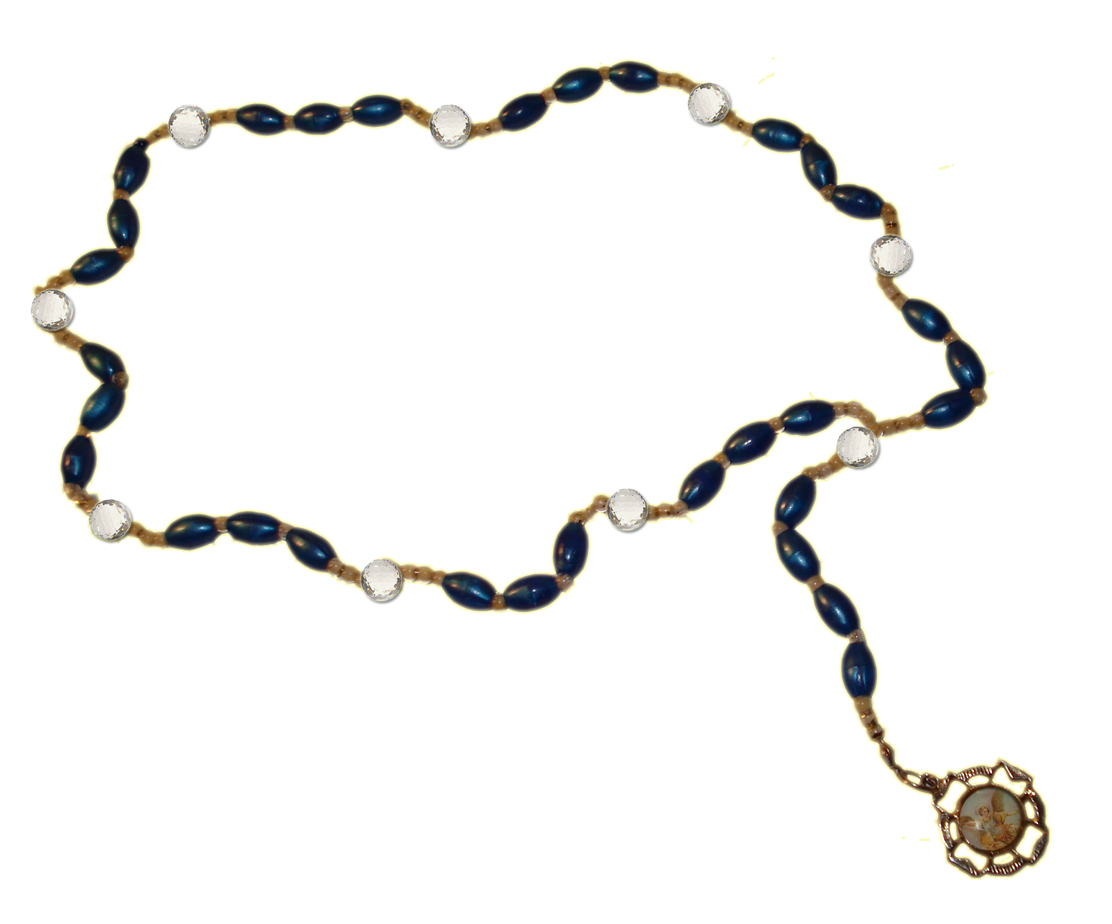
A Saint Michael Chaplet using beads like a rosary

=== Chaplet ===
The Chaplet of Saint Michael is a chaplet attributed to a private revelation by Saint Michael to the Portuguese Carmelite nun Antónia d'Astónaco in 1751. This chaplet was approved by Pope Pius IX in 1851.

=== Scapular ===
The Scapular of St. Michael the Archangel is a Roman Catholic devotional scapular associated with Saint Michael. Pope Pius IX gave to this scapular his blessing, but it was first formally approved under Pope Leo XIII who sanctioned the Archconfraternity of the Scapular of Saint Michael.

St. Michael defeating Satan by Carlo Crivelli, 15th century

=== Exorcism ===
A prayer to Saint Michael is included in the Rite of Exorcism in the Roman Ritual, and was retained, in edited form, in the 1999 revision of the rite. At the Benedictine Metten Abbey dedicated to Saint Michael the exorcism formula Vade Retro Satana was discovered in the 17th century.

=== Hymns ===
Through the centuries, Catholic devotions to Saint Michael have resulted in a number of poems and hymns.

Rabanus' hymn, Christ, the fair glory of the holy angels (Christe, sanctorum decus Angelorum), sung for the commemoration of Saint Michael and All Angels, and to include the archangels Gabriel and Raphael, is found in English translation in The Hymnal 1982 (of the Episcopal Church), and was harmonized by Ralph Vaughan Williams.

The hymn "Te Splendor" to Saint Michael (which derives its name from the fact that in Latin it begins with Te splendor et virtus Patris) is published in the Raccolta collection of prayers.

== Art and architecture ==
=== Paintings ===
Saint Michael symbolizes the victory of good over evil, and he has been widely represented in art through the ages. Depictions of Saint Michael often portray the scene where Satan, or the fallen angels, are helpless below the sword or spear of a triumphant Saint Michael. In some depictions, the Latin phrase Quis ut Deus? can be seen on the shield of Saint Michael. The phrase means "Who is like God?" and Saint Michael asks it scornfully as he slays Satan, represented as a dragon, or a man-like figure, at times with wings.

The original meaning of the name Michael gave rise to the Latin phrase Quis ut Deus? which can be seen on his artistic portrayals of Michael defeating Satan.

The triumphant St. Michael, by Dosso Dossi, 16th century

St. Michael and fallen angels Rubens, 17th century

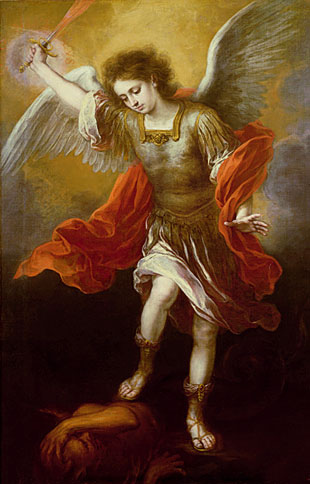
St. Michael in victory, Bartolomé Esteban Murillo, 17th century

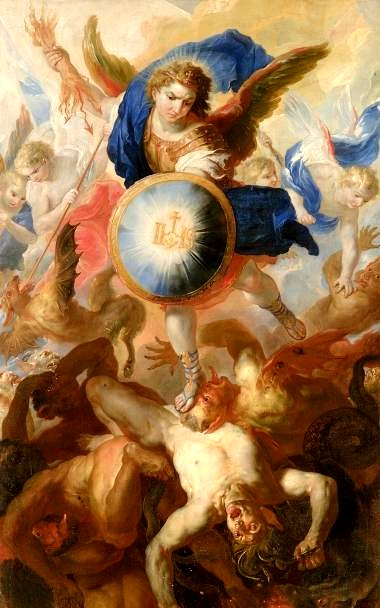
Johann M. Rottmayr, St. Michael's Triumph, 1697
St. Michael by Guariento, 14th century

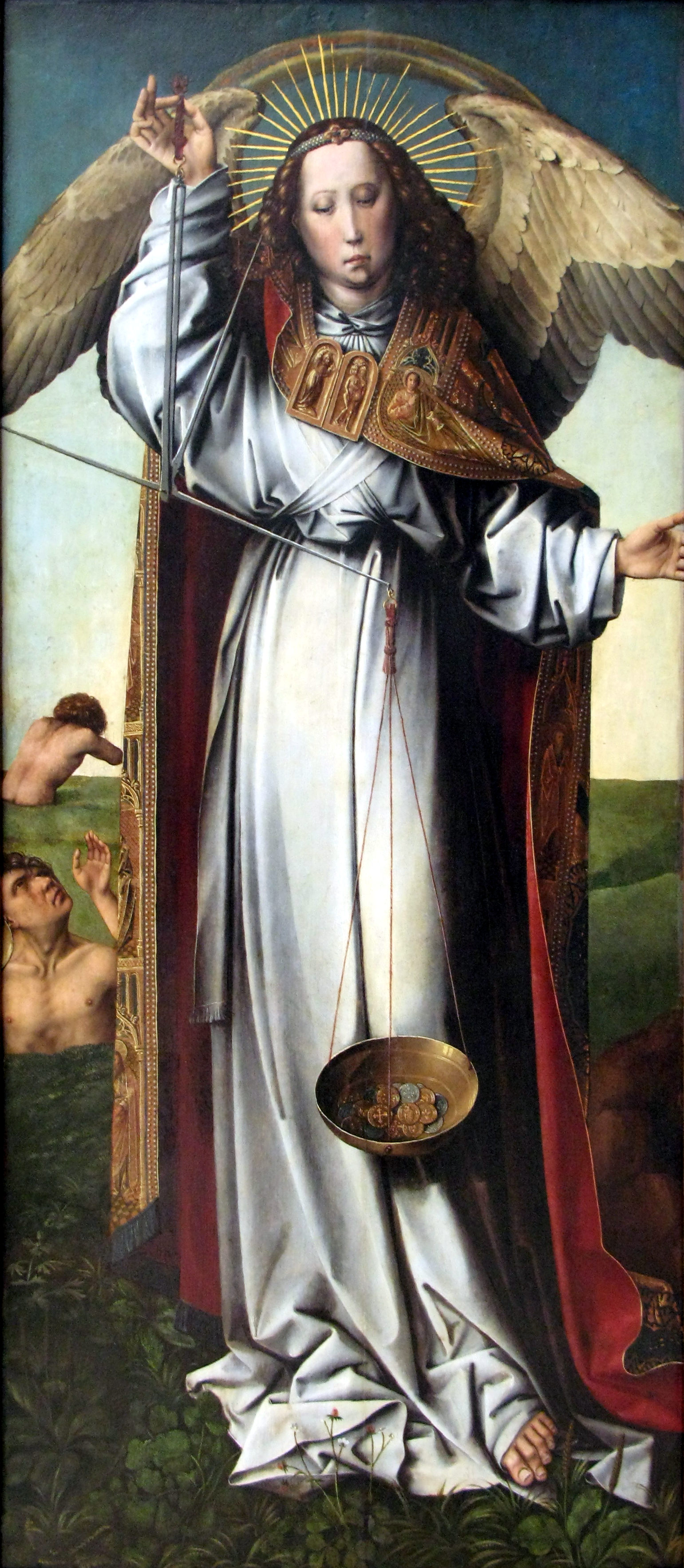
St Michael weighing souls during the Last Judgement, 16th century, Cologne

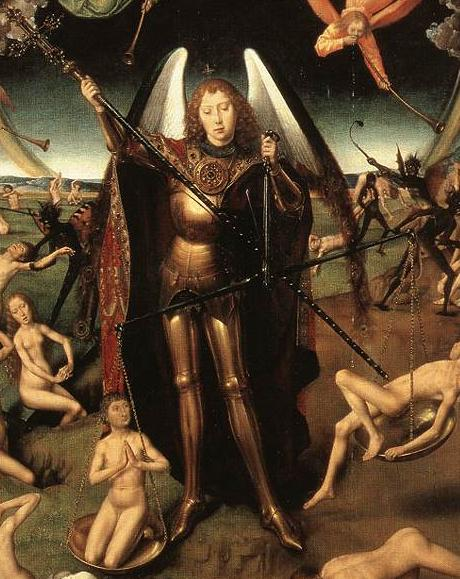
St. Michael weighing souls on Judgement Day by Hans Memling, 15th century

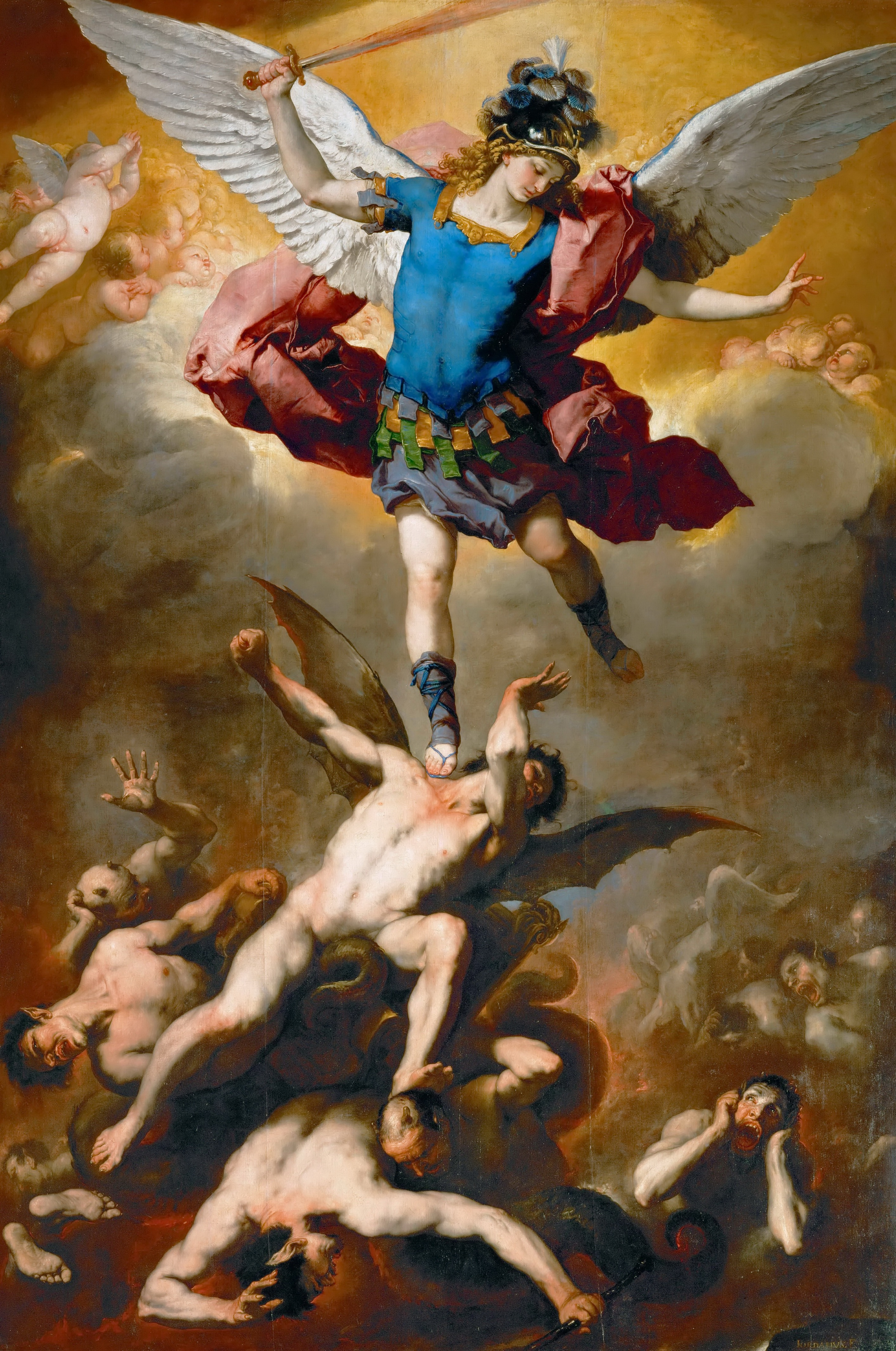
Archangel Michael and fallen angels, Luca Giordano c. 1660–65

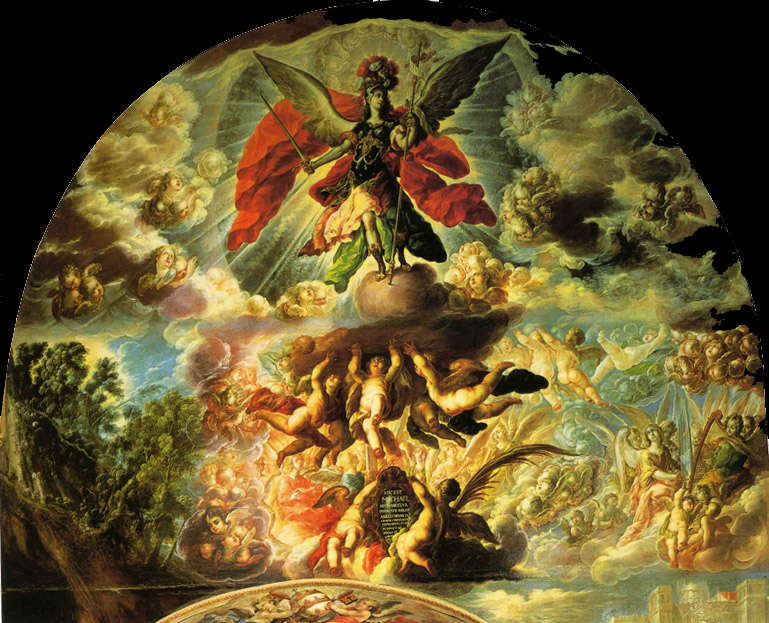
Apparition of Saint Michael, ca. 1686 by Cristóbal de Villalpando. Mexico City Metropolitan Cathedral collection. Colonial Mexico.

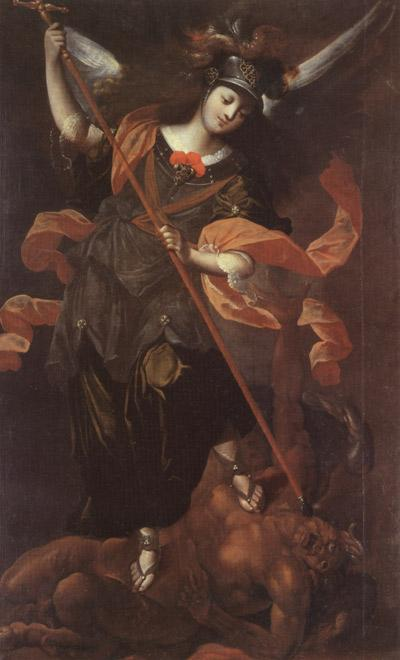
Archangel St. Michael from Sopó Archangels, a series of archangels painted around 1650 in colonial Colombia.

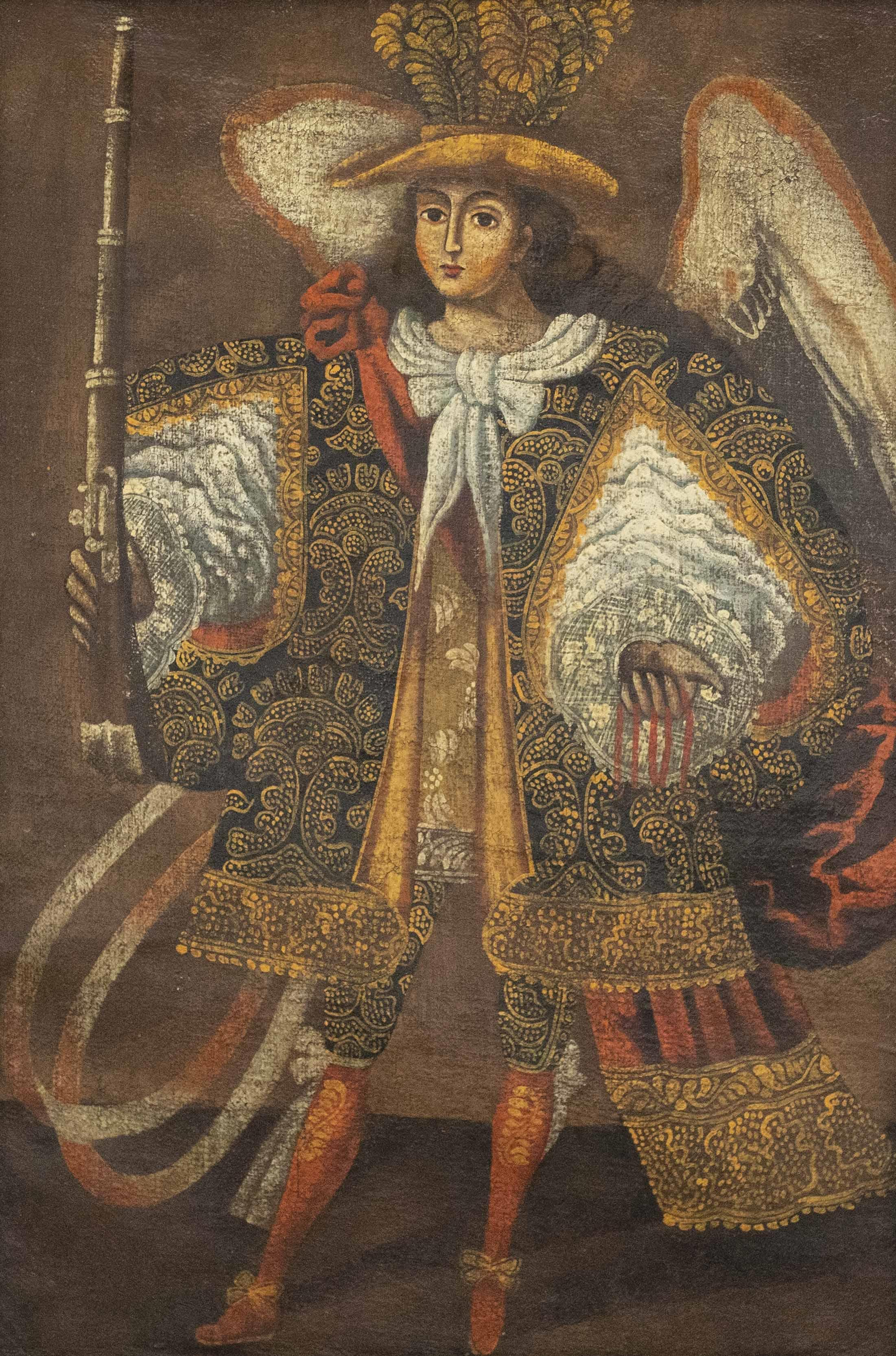
Archangel Michael from the Arquebusier Angels, Colonial Bolivia and Peru, 17th century, were part of the Cusco Colonial Painting School

=== Icons ===
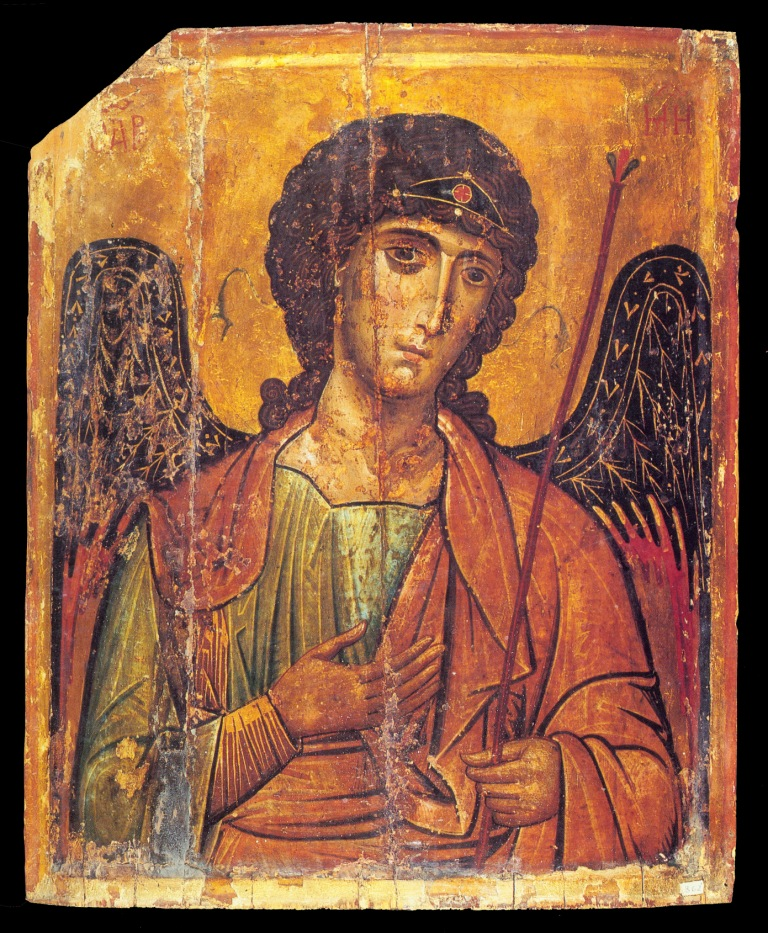
13th century icon, Saint Catherine's Monastery

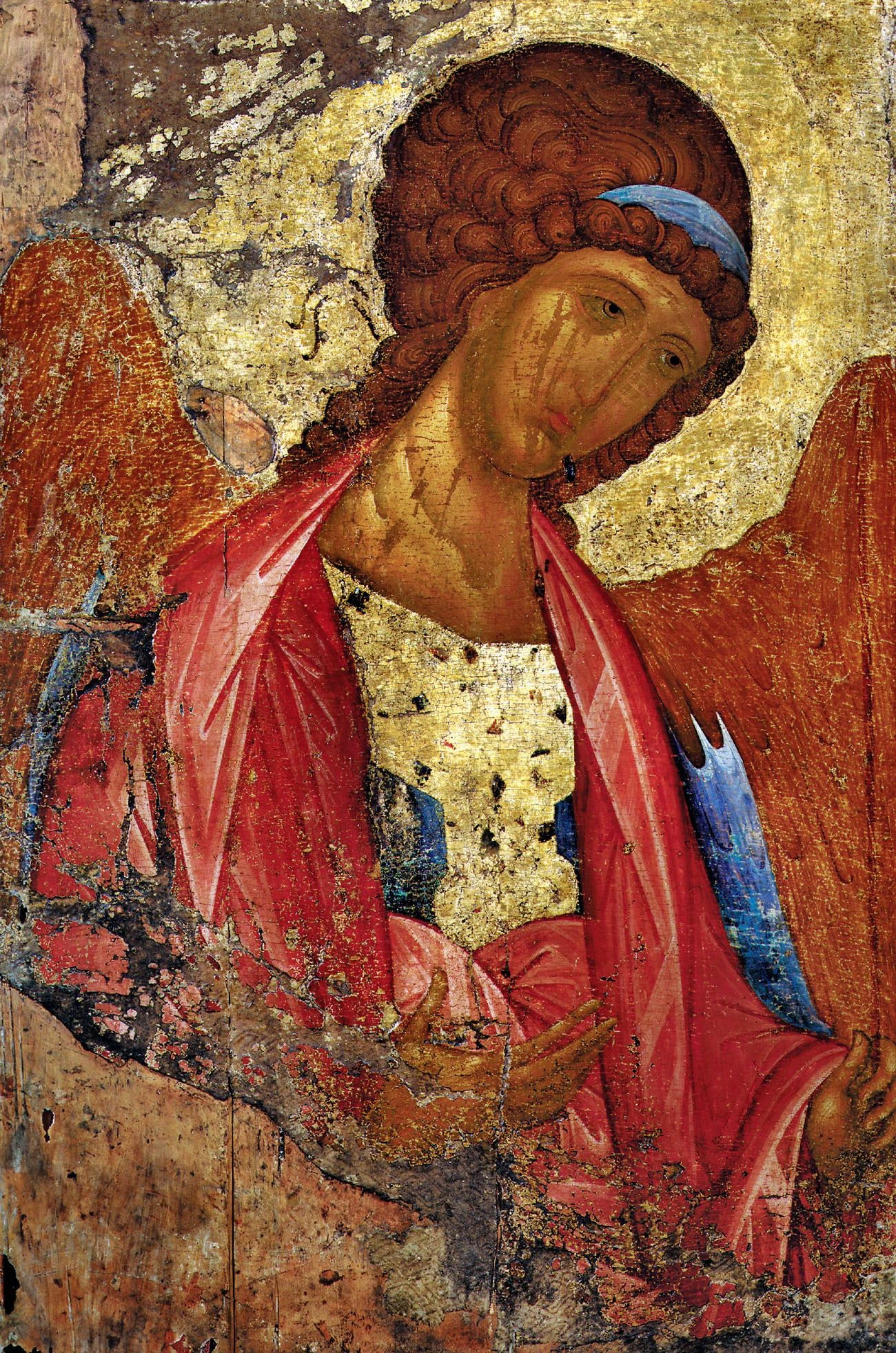
Russian icon by Andrei Rublev, c. 1408

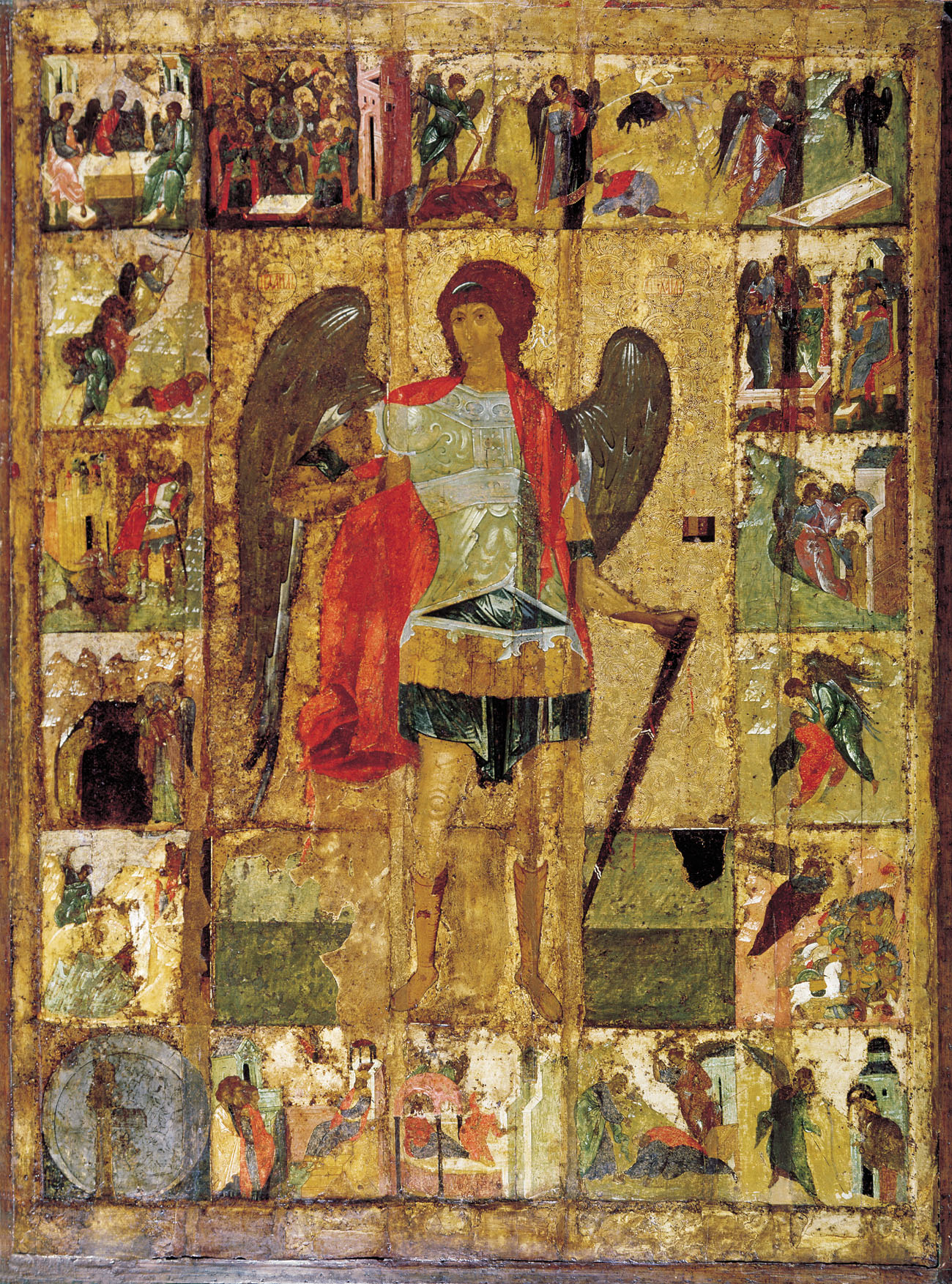
Michael the Archangel and biblical scenes, Russian icon, c. 1410

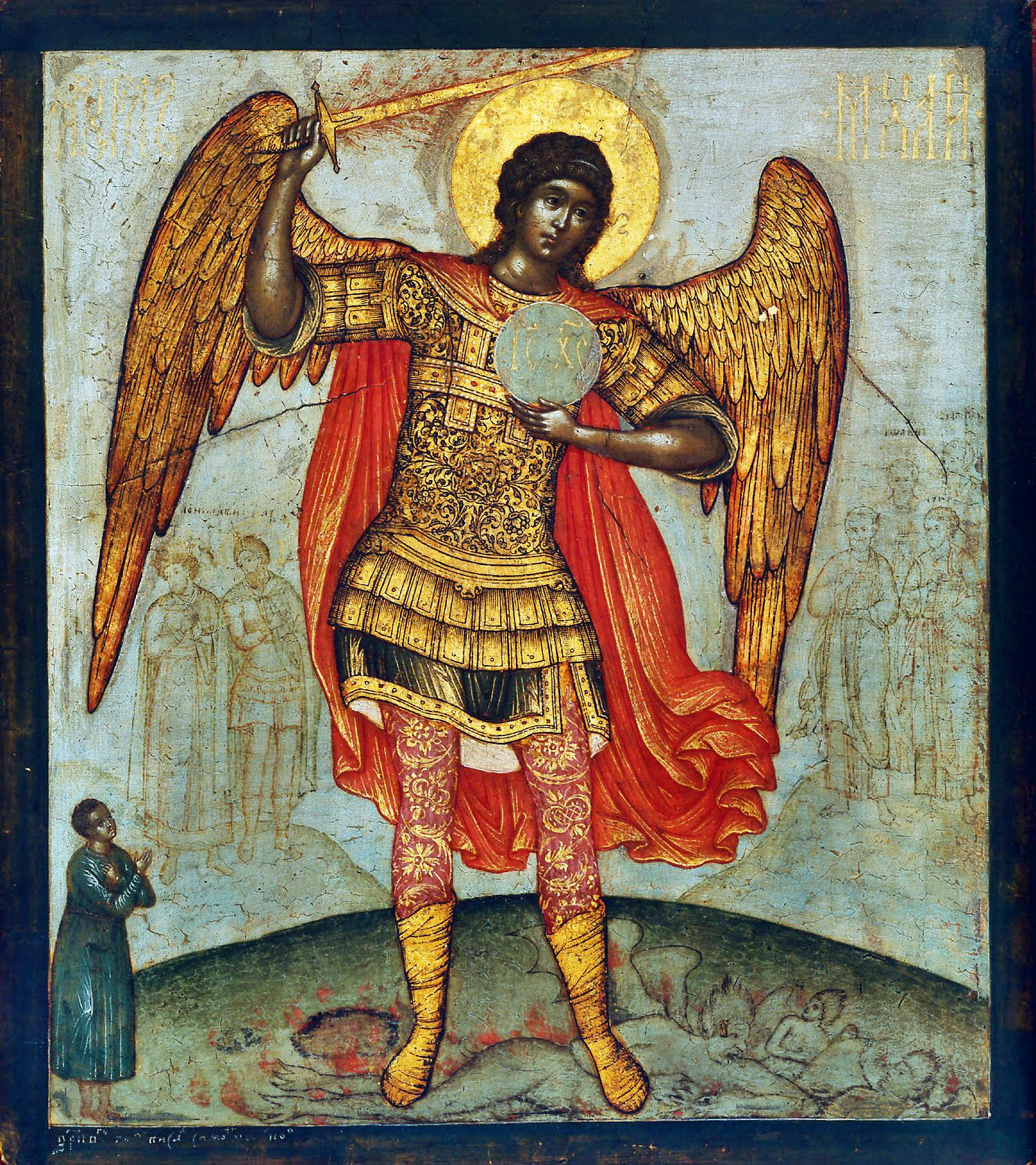
Archangel Michael in Victory, by Simon Ushakov, 1676
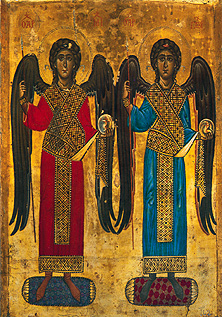
Archangels Michael and Gabriel, 12th century, Saint Catherine's Monastery

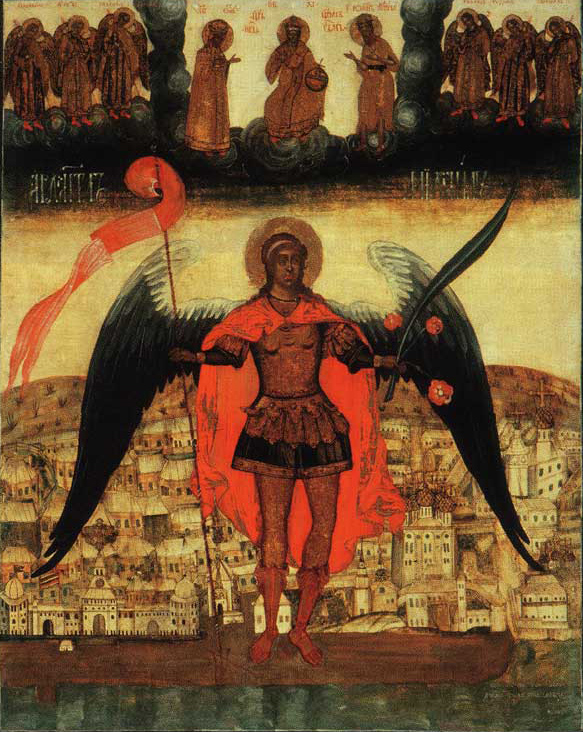
City of Archangel Michael with other angels and saints, Russian icon, 1741

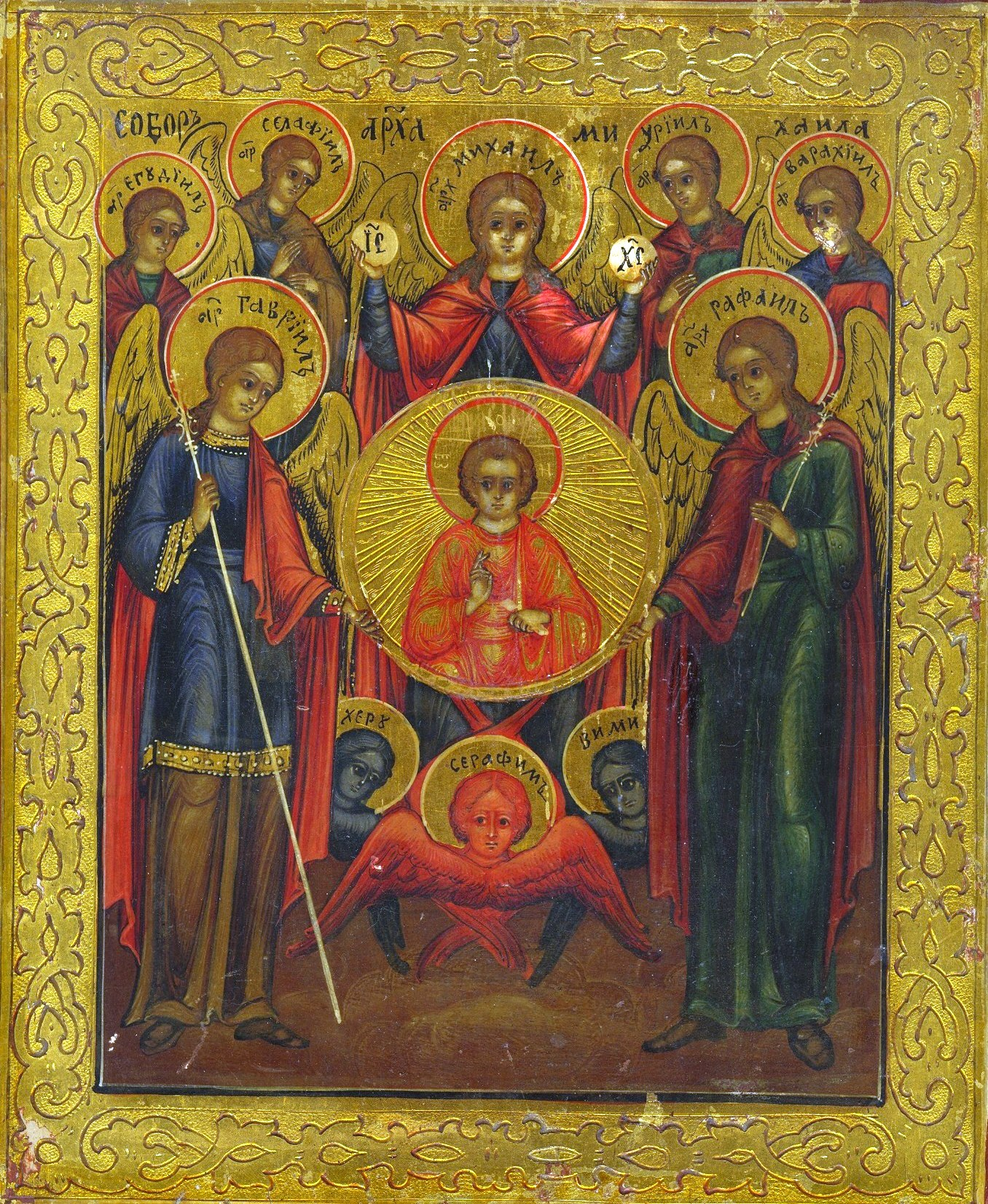
Russian icon of the Seven Archangels including Michael, 19th century

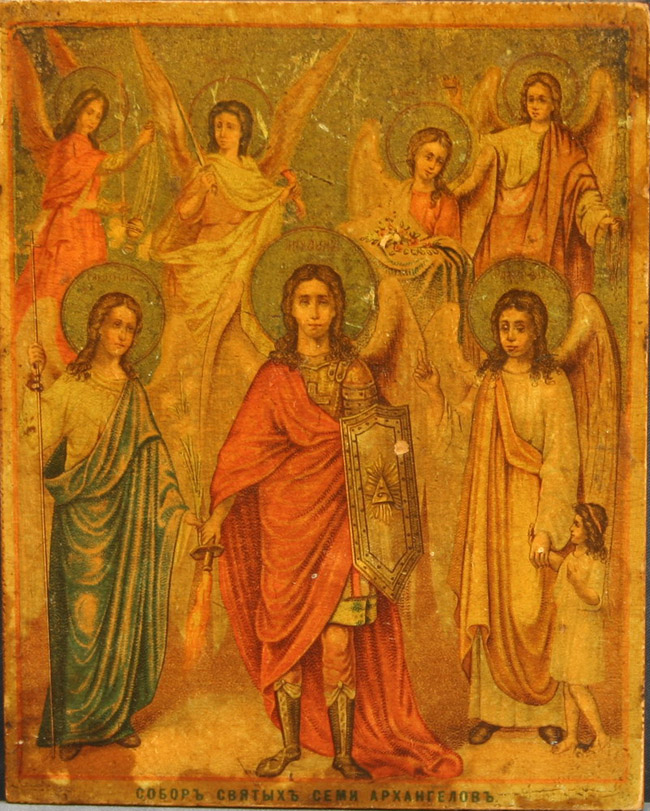
Gathering of the 7 Holy Archangels, early 20th-century Russian icon

=== Statues ===
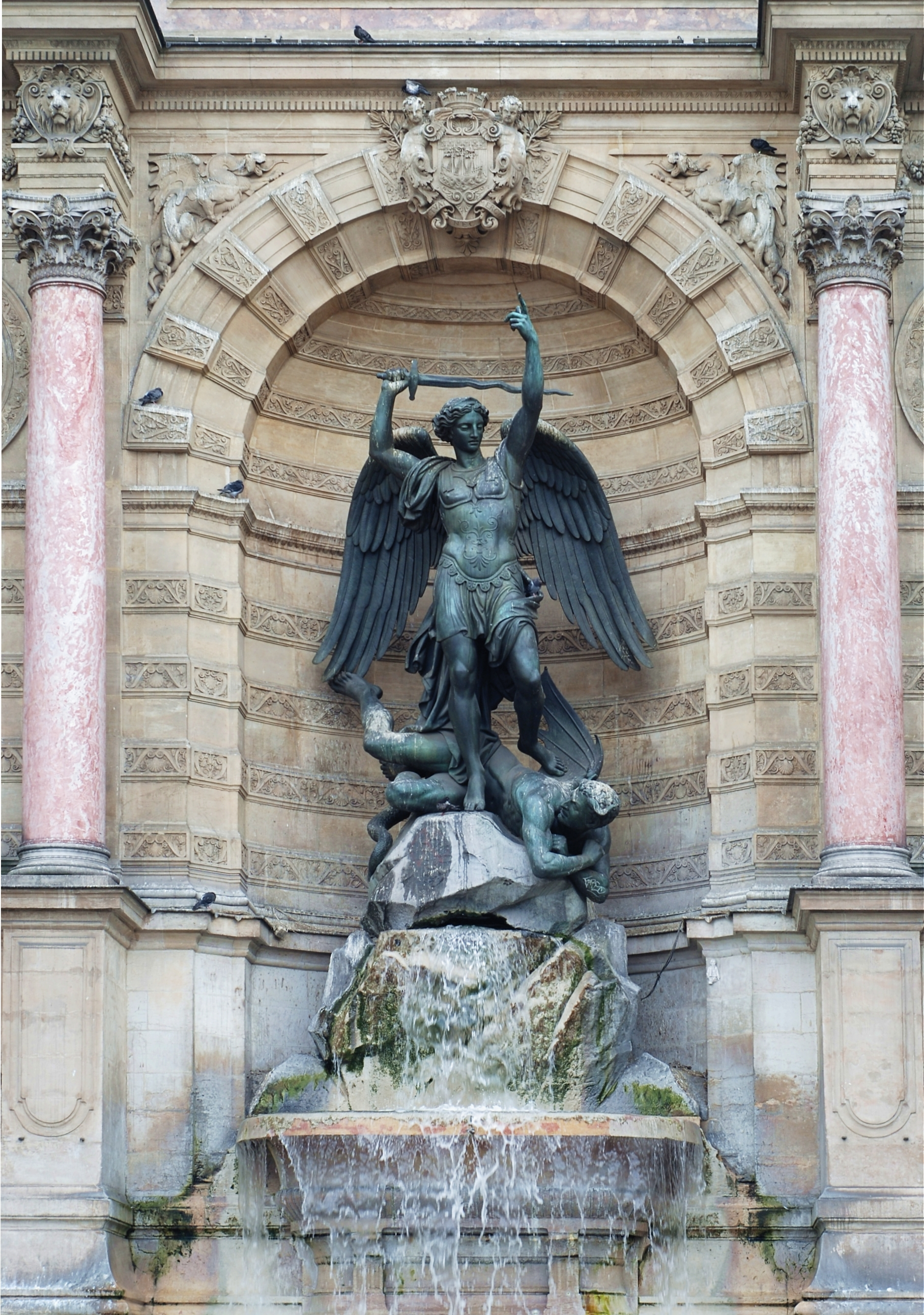
St Michael's Fountain, on Boulevard Saint-Michel, Paris

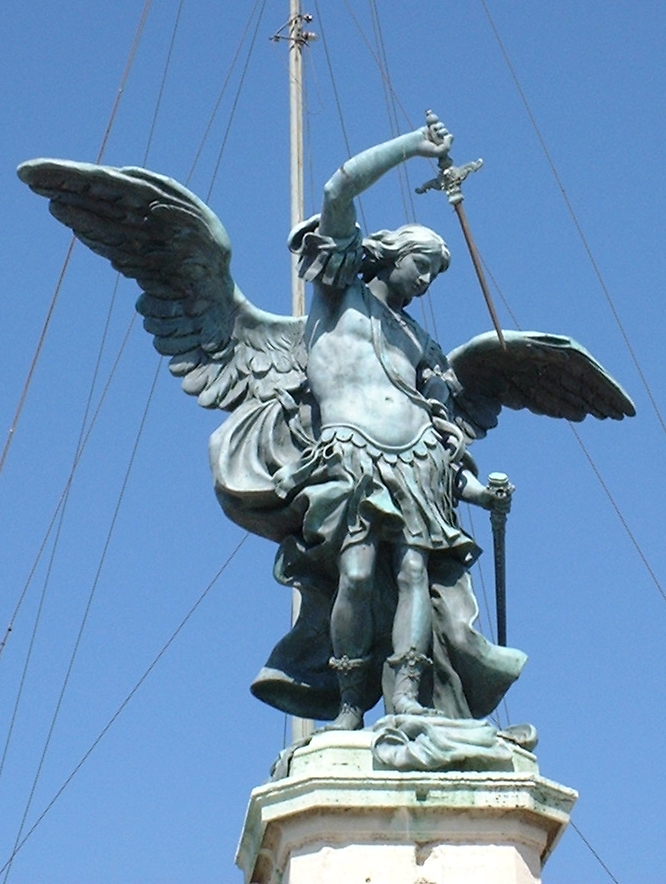
At Castel Sant'Angelo, Rome, 1753

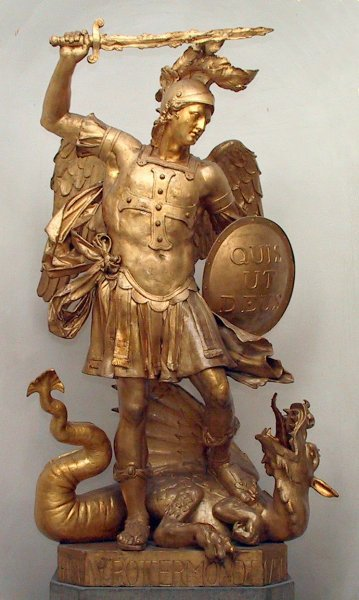
Electoral Palace, Bonn, former seat of the Order of Saint Michael, Germany

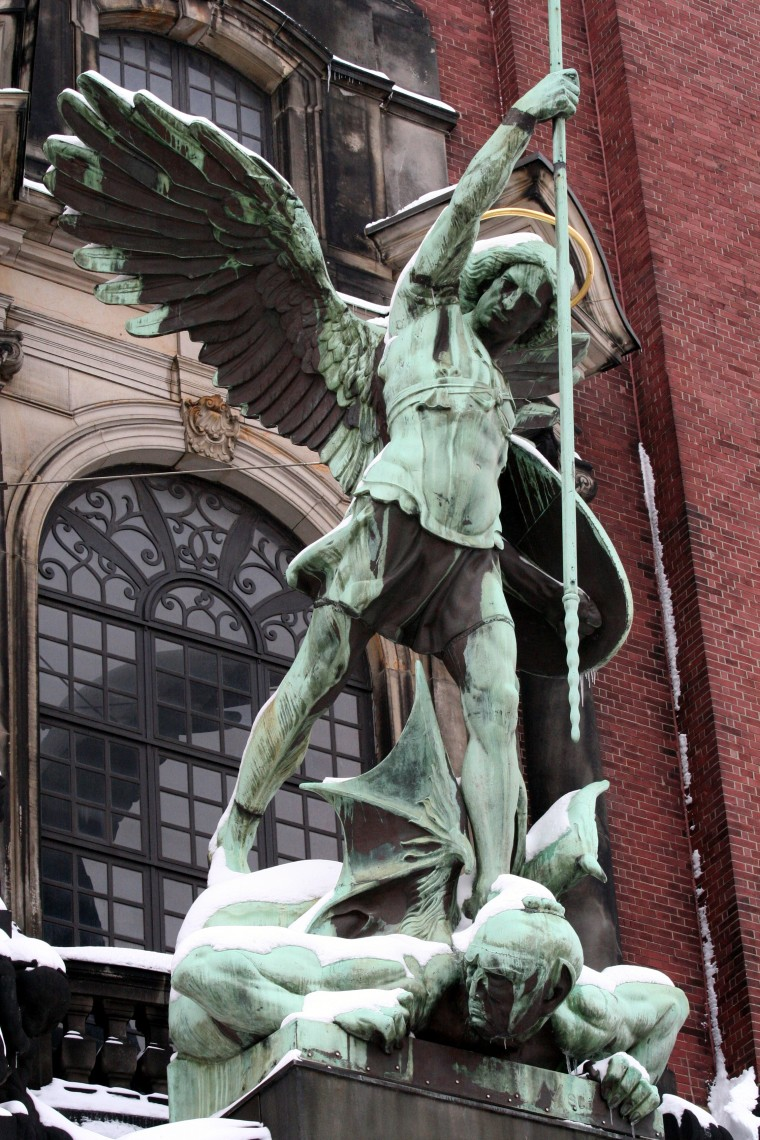
Hamburg, Germany

=== Churches ===
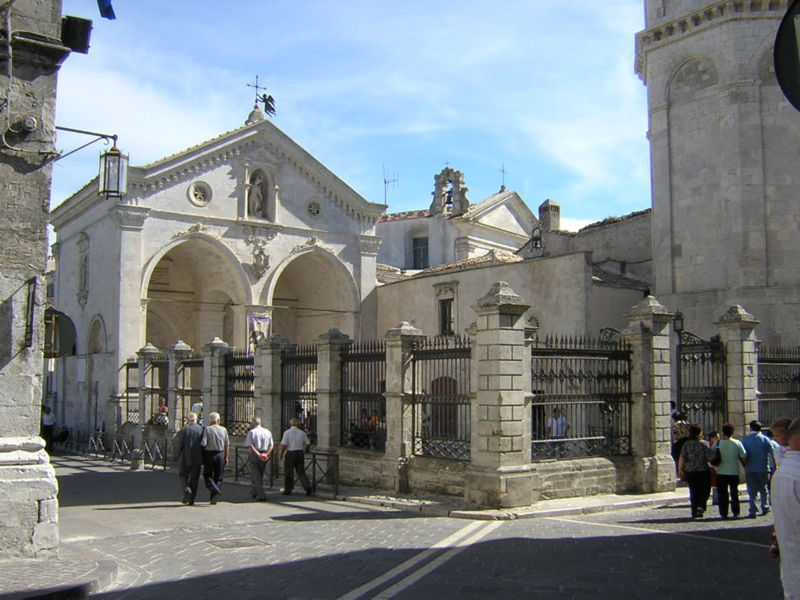
Sanctuary of St. Michael the Archangel, Mount Sant'Angelo, Italy

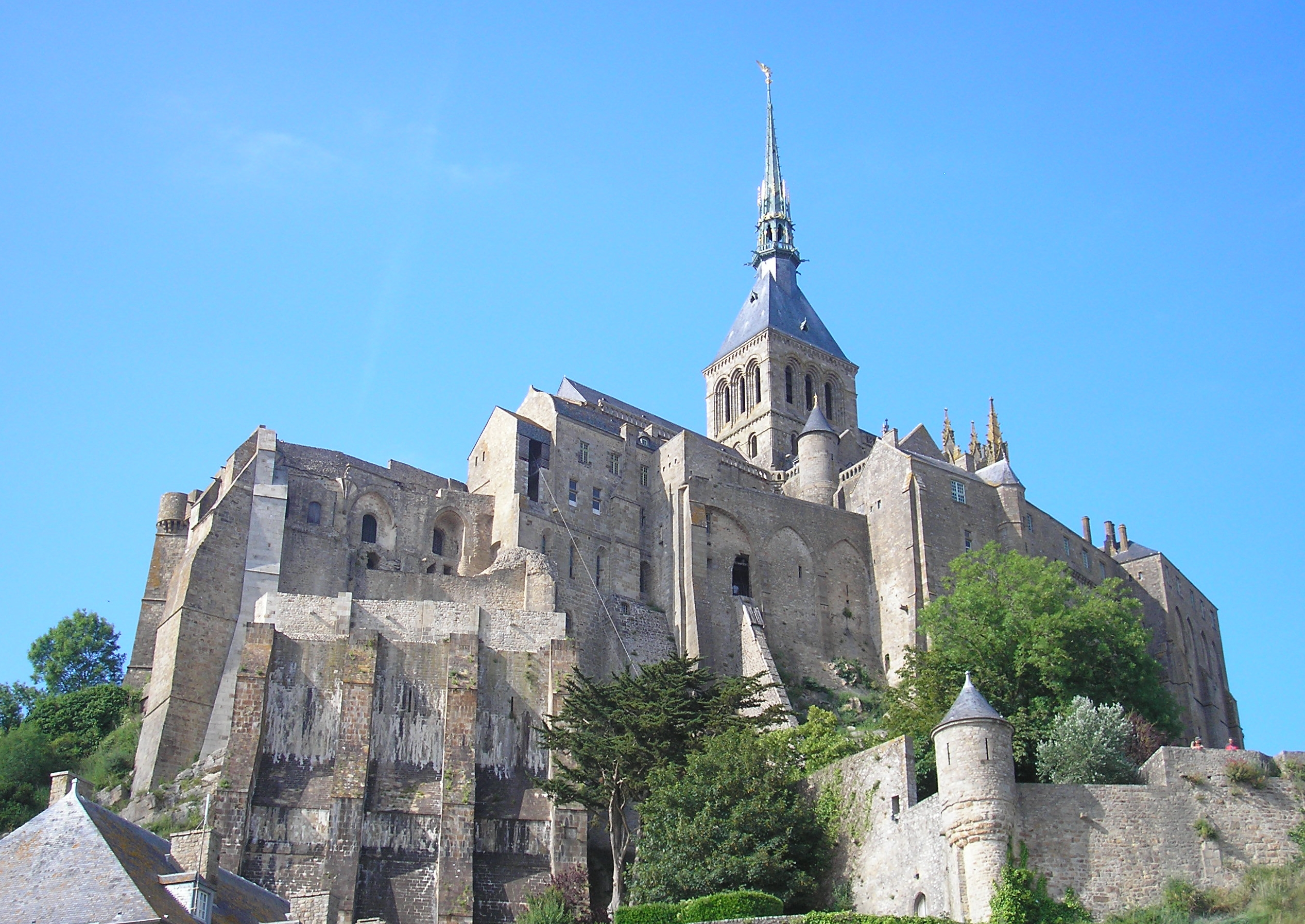
Mont Saint-Michel Abbey, Mount Saint Michael, France

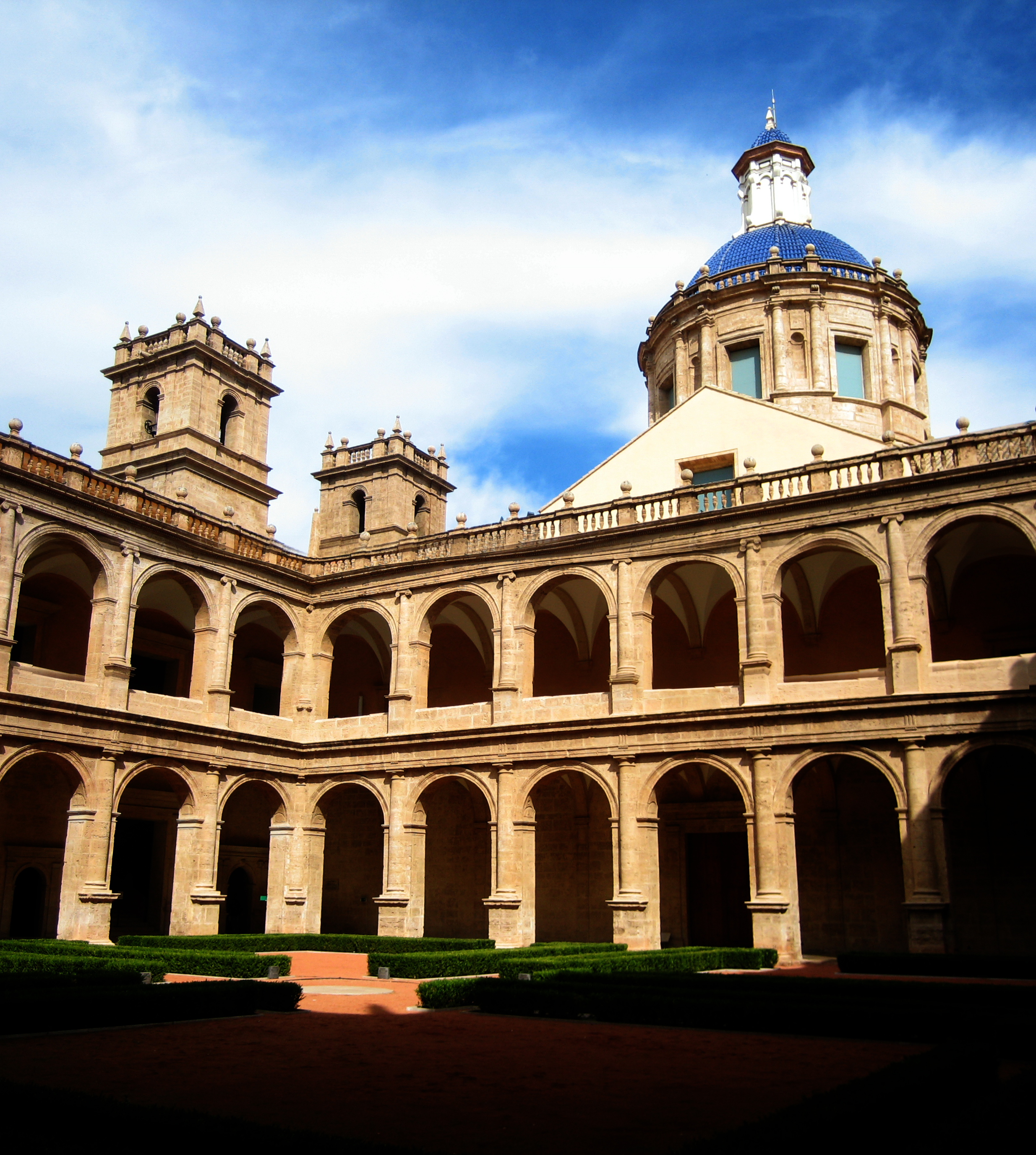
San Miguel de Los Reyes Monastery, Valencia, Spain

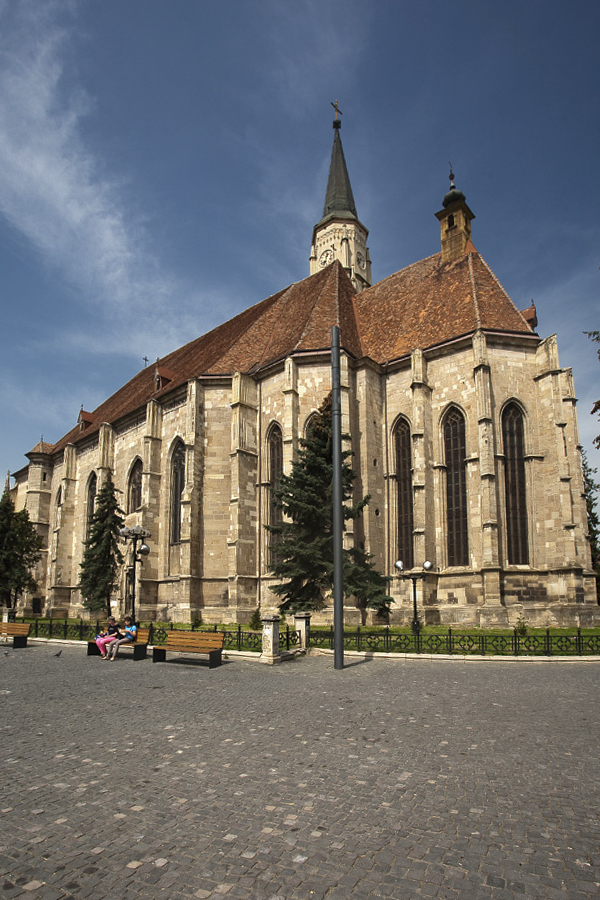
St. Michael's Church, Cluj-Napoca, Romania

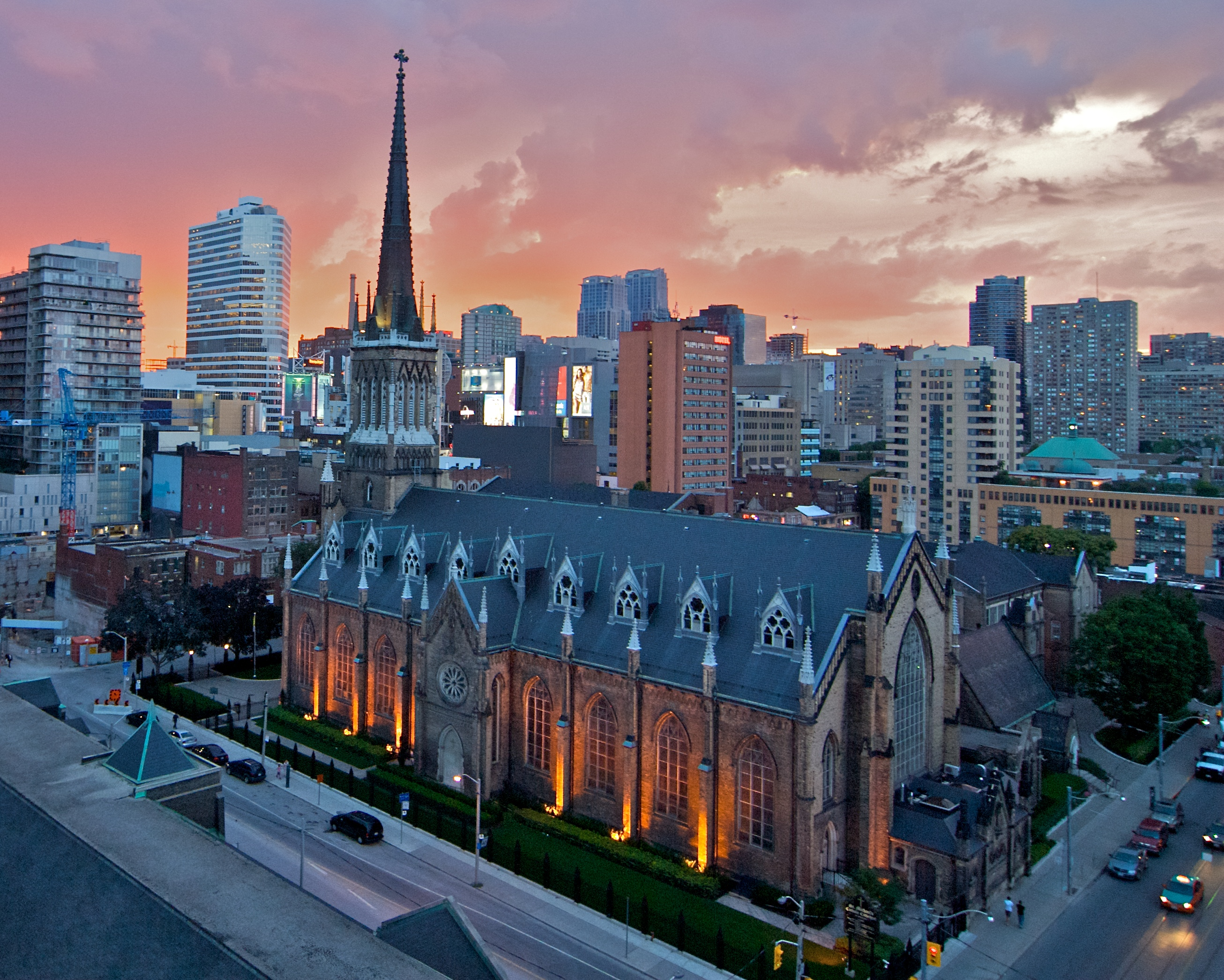
St. Michael's Cathedral, Toronto

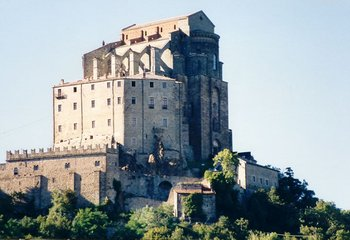
Sacra di San Michele, c. 1000 Piedmont, Italy

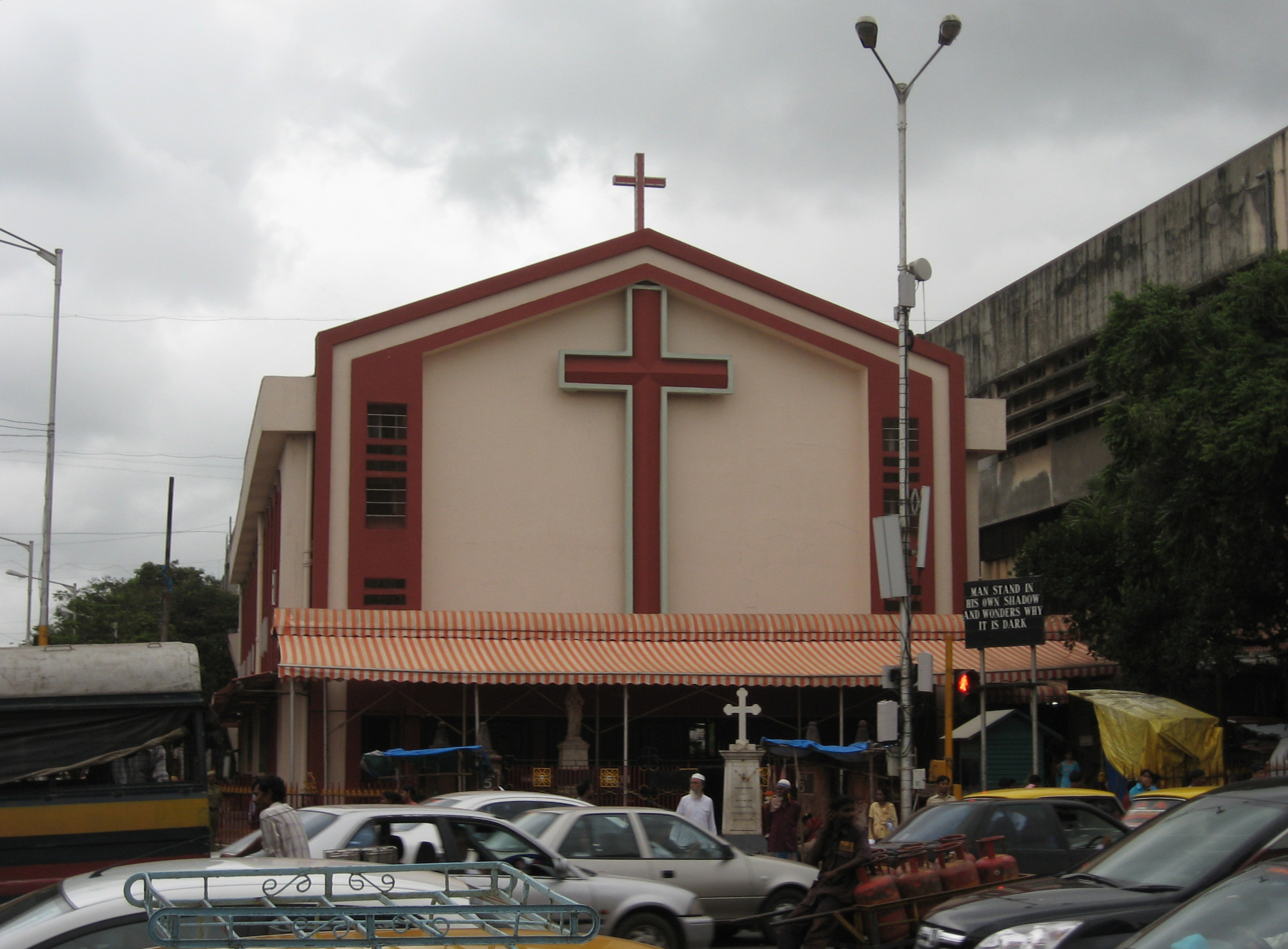
St. Michael's Church, Mumbai, India

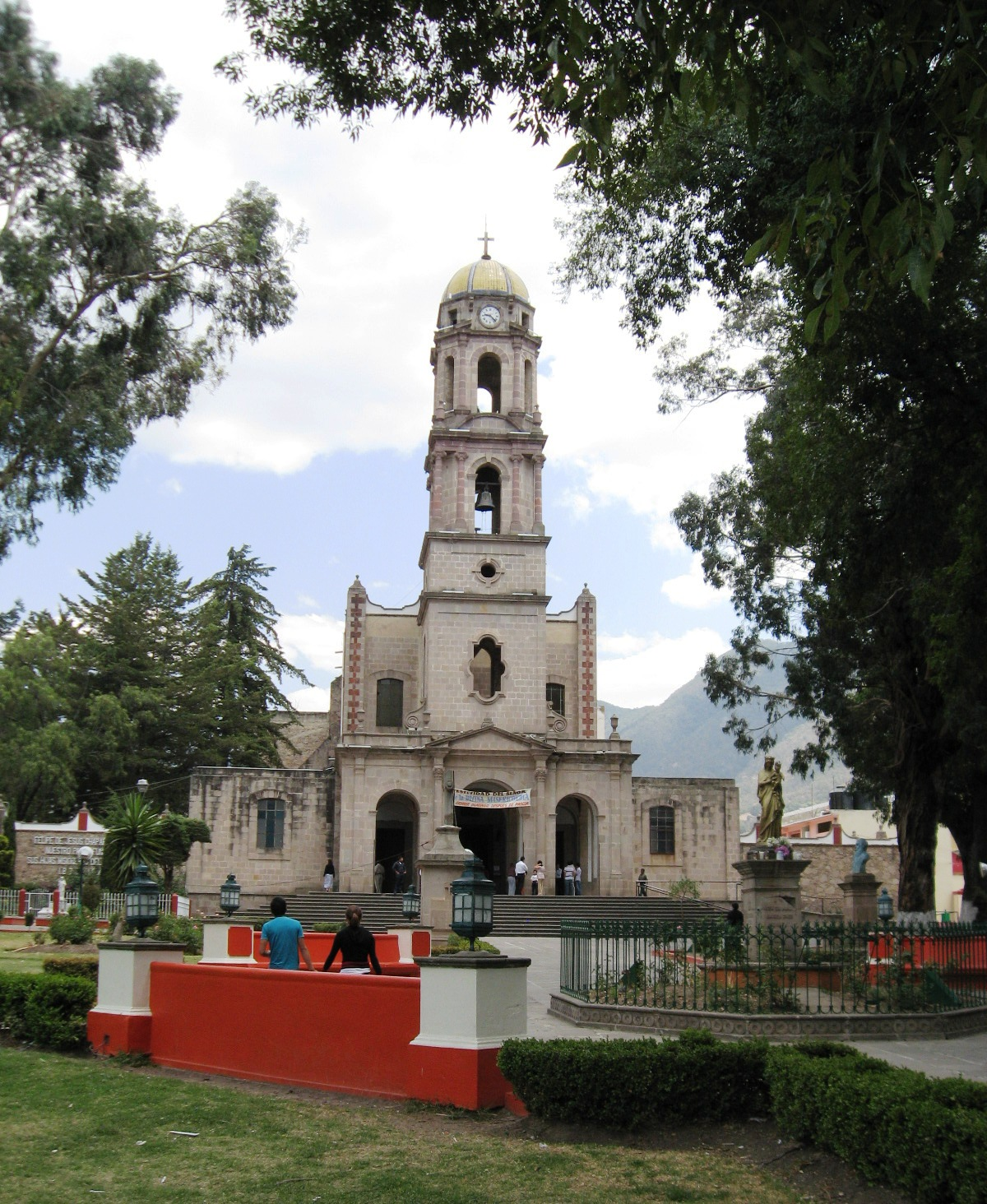
San Miguel church, Temascalcingo, Mexico

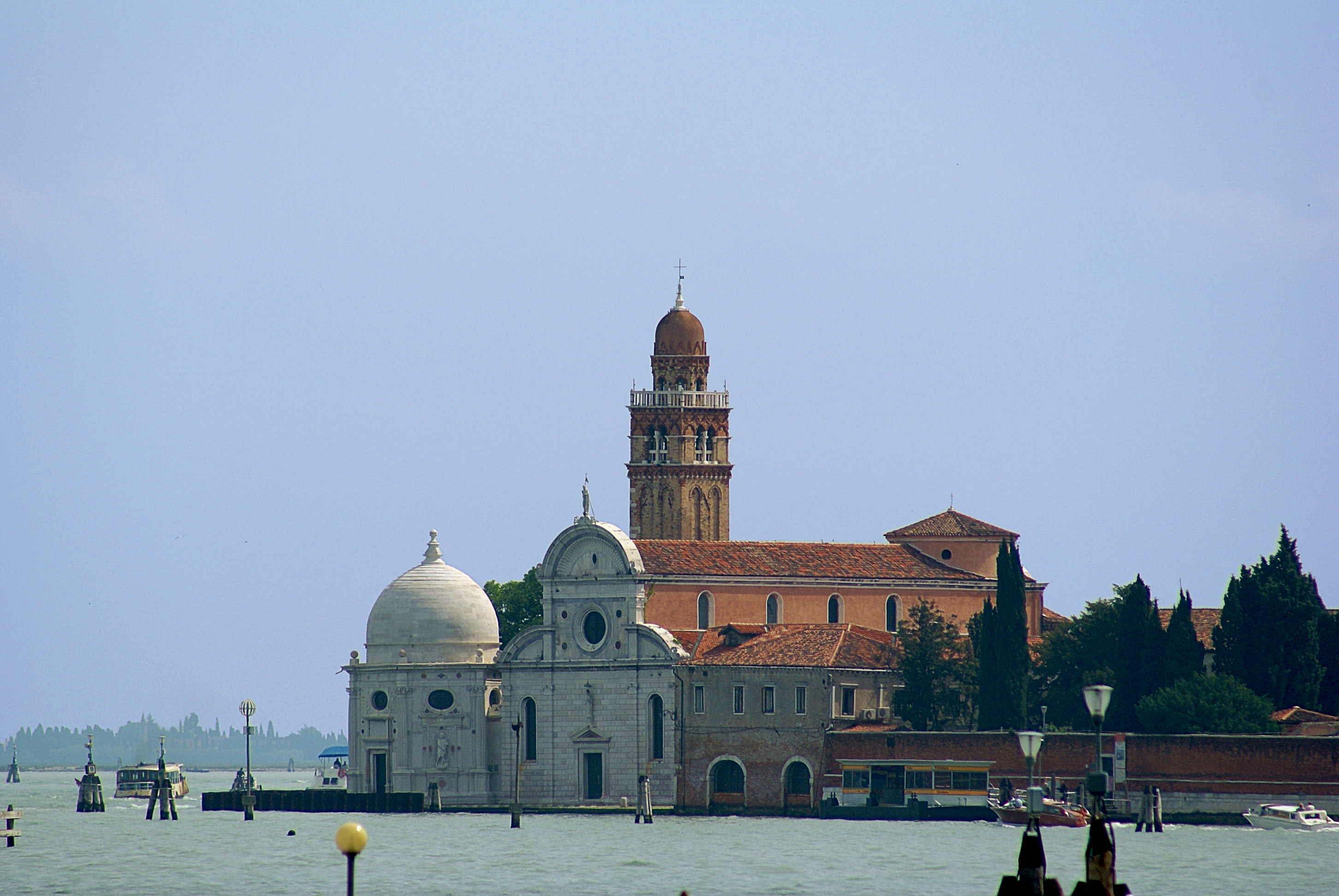
San Michele in Isola, Venice, Italy

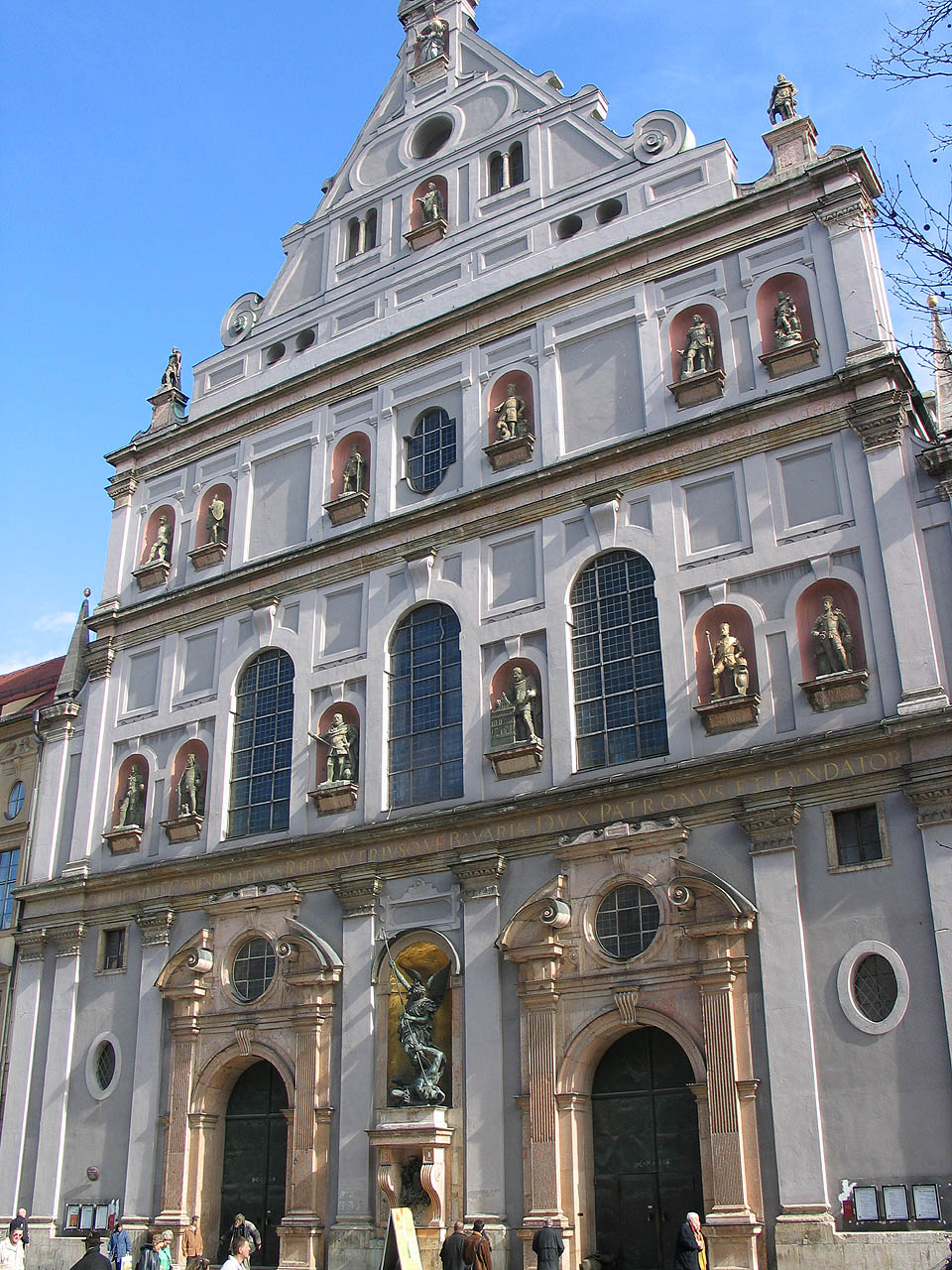
St. Michael's Jesuite church, Munich, Bavaria, Germany

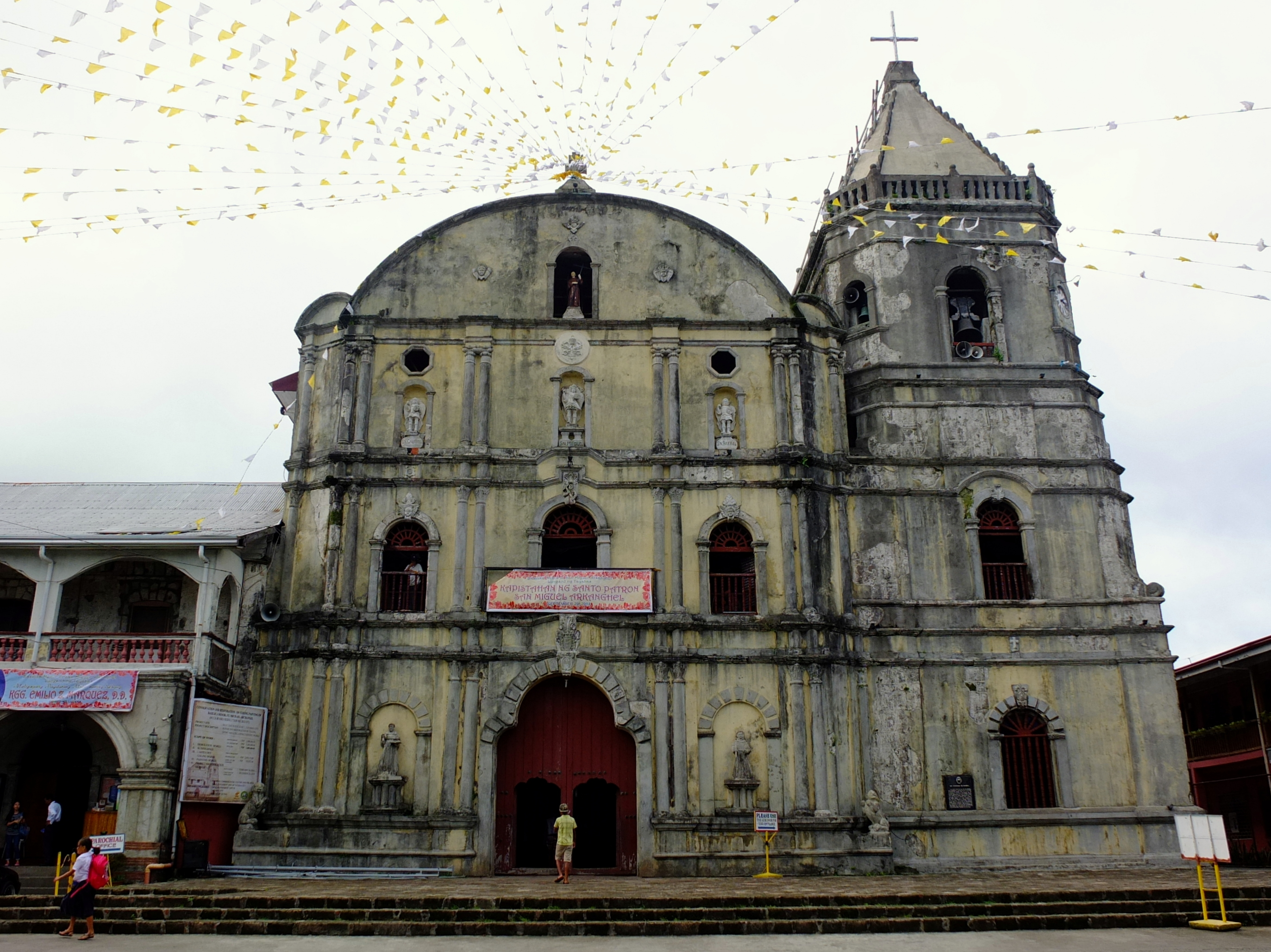
Minor Basilica of St. Michael the Archangel, Tayabas City, Quezon Province, Philippines

==== Altars ====
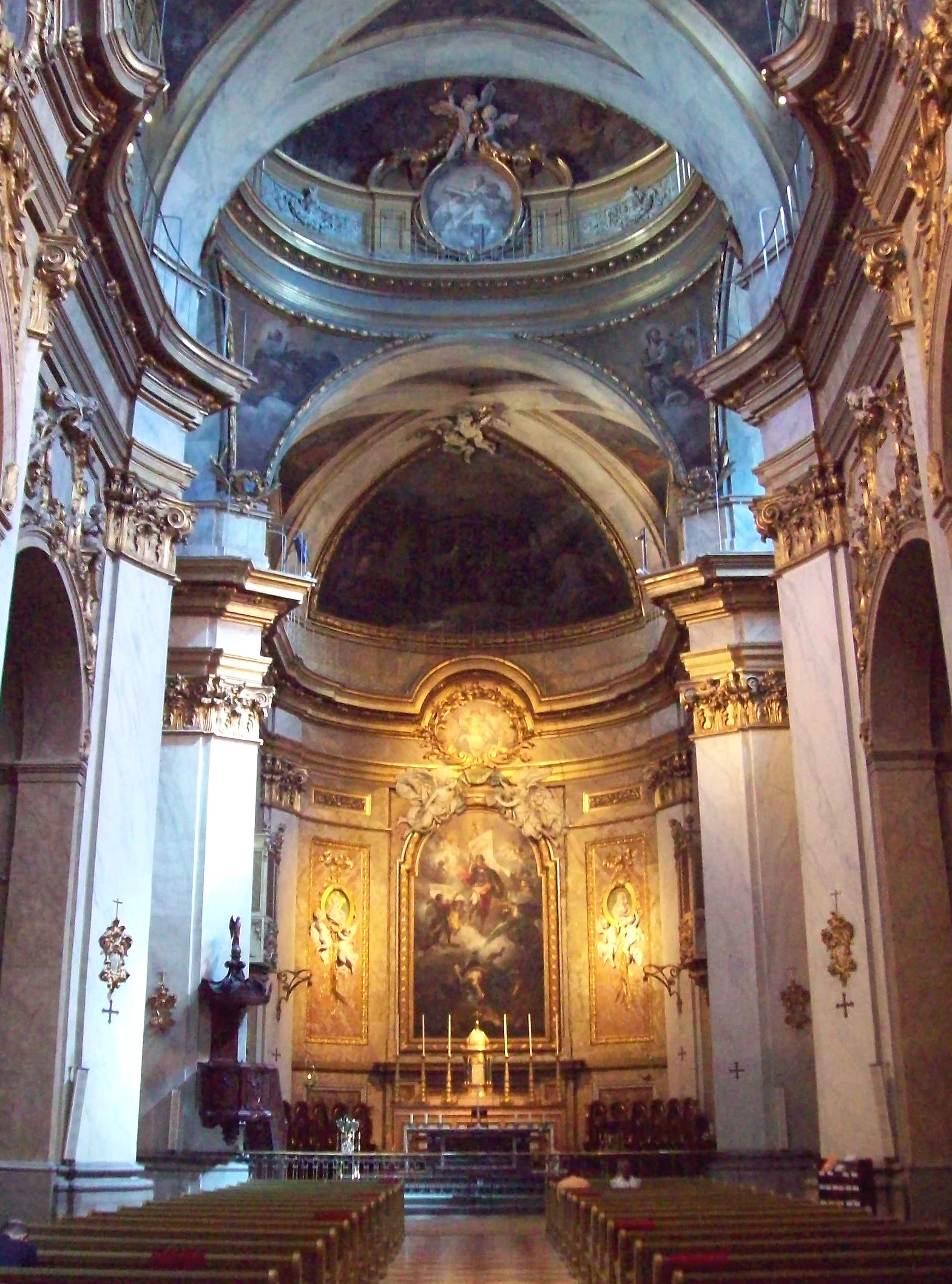
St. Michael's Basilica, Madrid, Spain

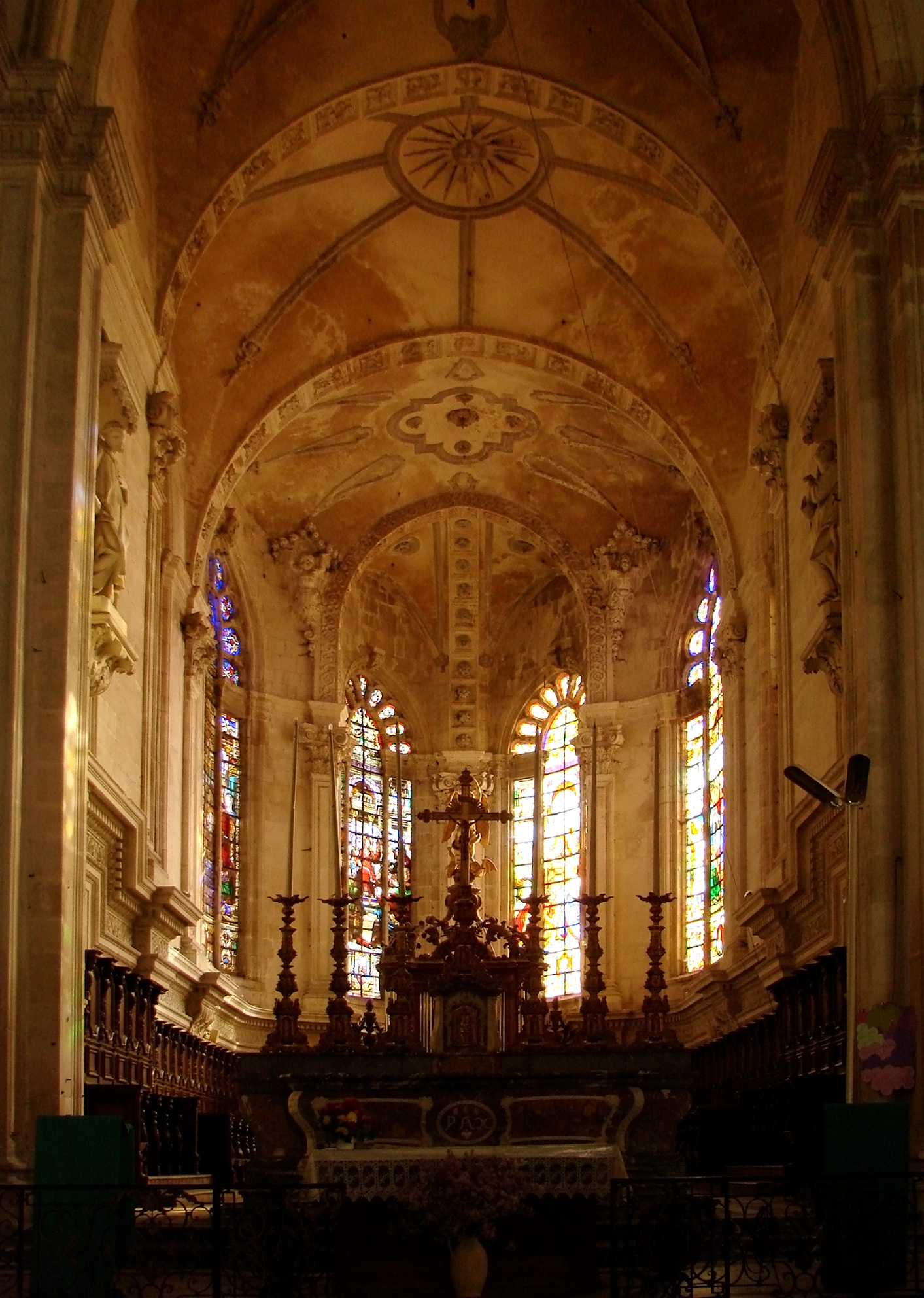
Saint Michel Church, Saint-Mihiel, Lorraine, France

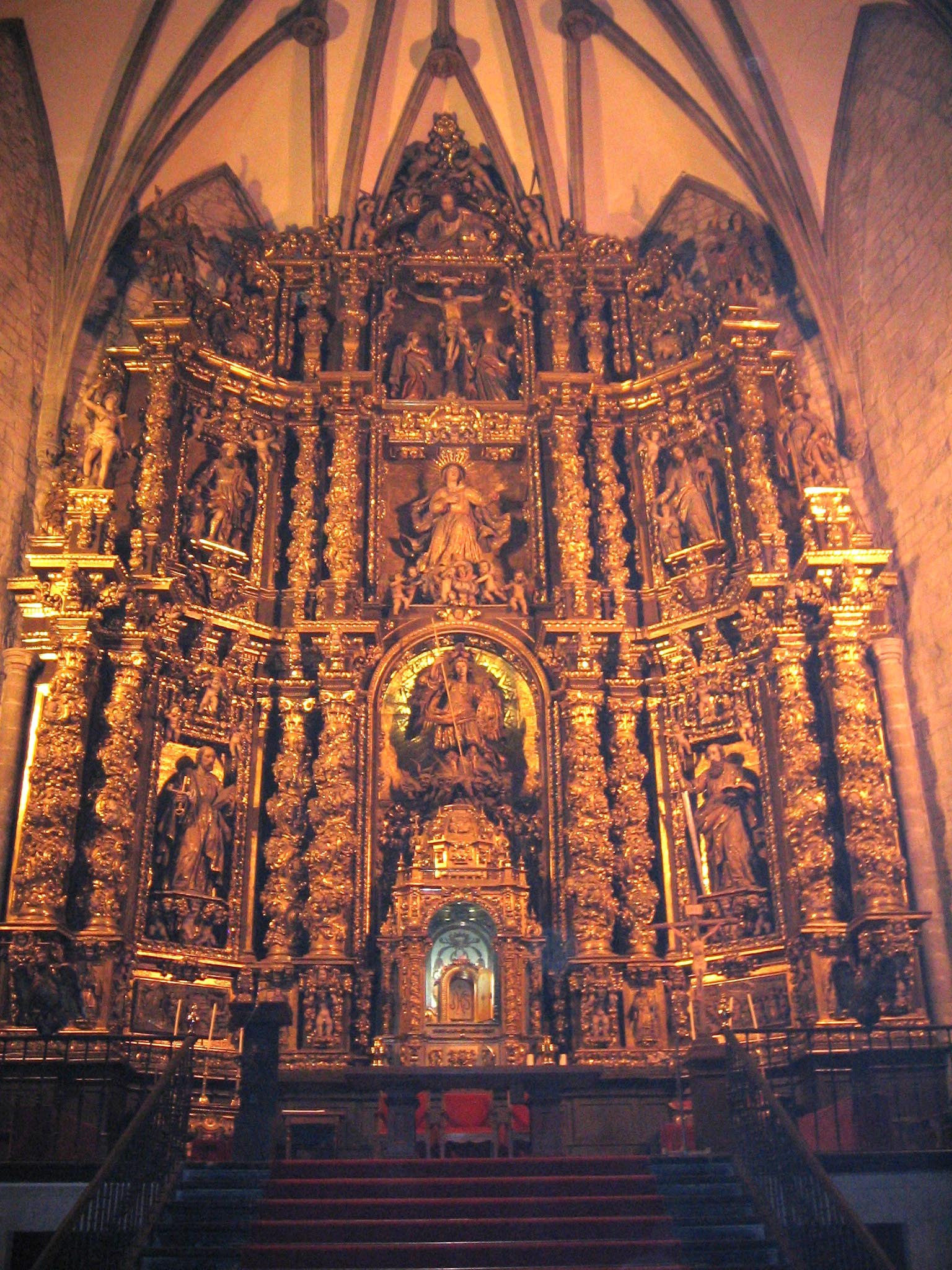
San Miguel Church, Oñati, Basque Country

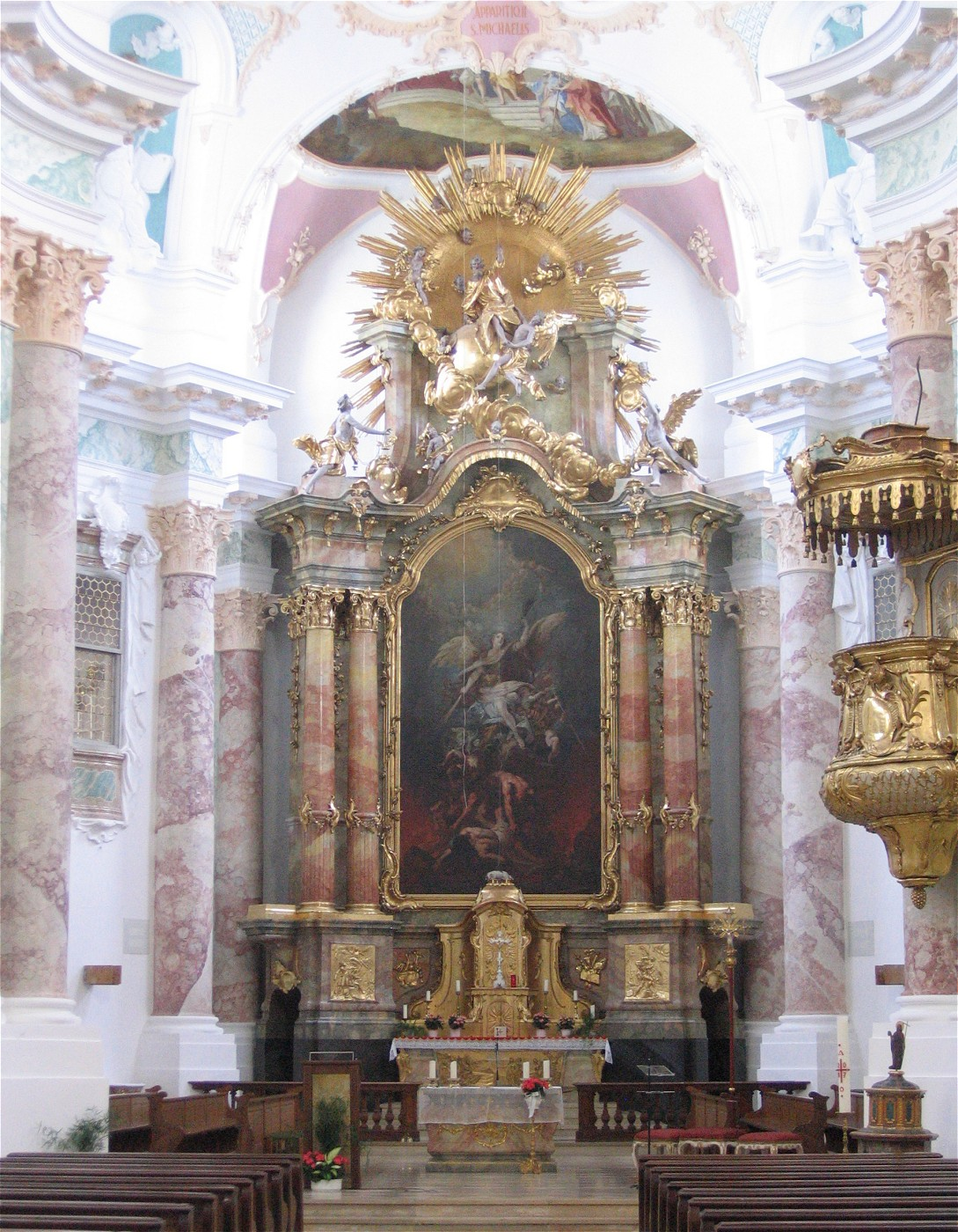
St. Michael in Berg am Laim, Munich, Germany

== See also ==
- Christian angelology
- Michaelmas
- Novena to Saint Michael
- St. Michael's Cave
- St. Michael's Lent

== Sources ==
- Ball, Anne (2003). Encyclopedia of Catholic Devotions and Practices. OSV Press. ISBN 0-87973-910-X.
- Johnson, Richard Freeman (2005). Saint Michael the Archangel in Medieval English Legend. Boydell Press. ISBN 978-1-84383-128-0.
- O'Boyle, Donna-Marie (2008). Catholic Saints Prayer Book. OSV Publishing. ISBN 978-1-59276-285-9.
