= Quis ut Deus? =

Latin question "Who is like God?"

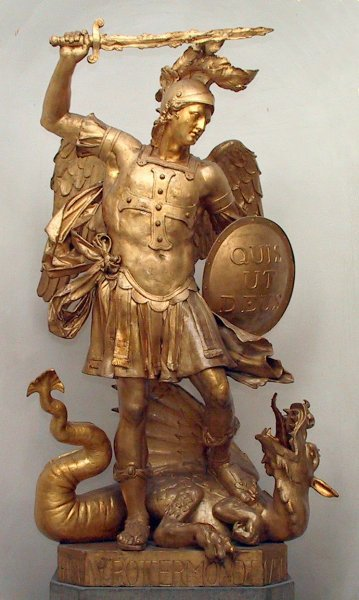
Statue of Archangel Michael slaying a dragon (interpreted to be Satan). The inscription on the shield reads: Quis ut Deus. Hallway in the headquarter of the former Military Order of Saint Michael in the Electoral Palace (now University of Bonn, Germany main building).

Quis ut Deus? (or Quis sicut Deus?), a Latin sentence meaning "Who [is] like God?", is a literal translation of the name Michael (Hebrew: מִיכָאֵל, transliterated Micha'el or Mîkhā'ēl).

The sentence Quis ut Deus? is particularly associated with Archangel Michael. In art, St. Michael is often represented as an angelic warrior, fully armed with helmet, sword, and shield, as he overcomes Satan, sometimes represented as a dragon and sometimes as a man-like figure. The shield at times bears the inscription: Quis ut Deus, the translation of the archangel's name, but capable also of being seen as his rhetorical and scornful question to Satan.

The Scapular of St. Michael the Archangel also bears this phrase.

== See also ==
- El (deity)
- Song of the Sea
- Michaelion
- Michaelmas
- Novena to Saint Michael
- Prayer to Saint Michael
- Saint Michael in the Catholic Church
