= Saint Michael's Lent =

Period of fasting observed in the Catholic Church

Saint Michael's Lent is a period of fasting observed as a private devotion by some members of the Catholic Church, from the Feast of the Assumption on August 15 to Michaelmas (the feast of St Michael) on September 29, excluding Sundays. According to Bonaventure, St. Michael's Lent originates in Franciscan tradition. It is also mentioned in Little Flowers of St. Francis. It was the custom for Francis of Assisi to fast before Michaelmas to honor the Blessed Virgin and St. Michael.

== See also ==
- Lent
- Saint Martin's Lent
