= Novena to Saint Michael =

Novena prayed to Saint Michael the Archangel

Archangel Michael by Jaime Huguet, 1456.

The Novena to Saint Michael is a Roman Catholic Novena prayed to Saint Michael the Archangel. Like all other novenas it is prayed on nine consecutive days with a specific intention.

== The Novena ==
A novena may be made at any time of the year, with any form of approved prayers. The novena to Saint Michael is customarily prayed on the nine days before the traditional feast day of September 29. A variety of prayers and formats may be used. Prayers commonly used are the Prayer to Saint Michael, the Chaplet of Saint Michael or a Litany.

=== Prayer to St. Michael ===
St. Michael the Archangel, defend us in battle; be our protection against the wickedness and snares of the devil. May God rebuke him, we humbly pray; and do thou, O prince of the heavenly host, by the power of God, cast into hell Satan and all the other evil spirits that prowl about the world seeking the ruin of souls. Amen.

=== Alternate novena prayer ===
Saint Michael the Archangel,
loyal champion of God and His People.
I turn to you with confidence
and seek your powerful intercession.

For the love of God,
Who made you so glorious in grace and power,
and for the love of the Mother of Jesus, the Queen of the Angels,
be pleased to hear our prayer.

You know the value of our souls in the eyes of God.
May no stain of evil ever disfigure its beauty.
Help us to conquer the evil spirit who tempts us.

We desire to imitate your loyalty to God and Holy Mother
and your great love for God and people.

And since you are God’s messenger for the care of His people,
we entrust to you these special intentions:
...specific intentions are stated here....

Lord, hear and grant our special intentions for this Novena. In the name of our blessed Lord and redeemer Jesus Christ.
Amen.

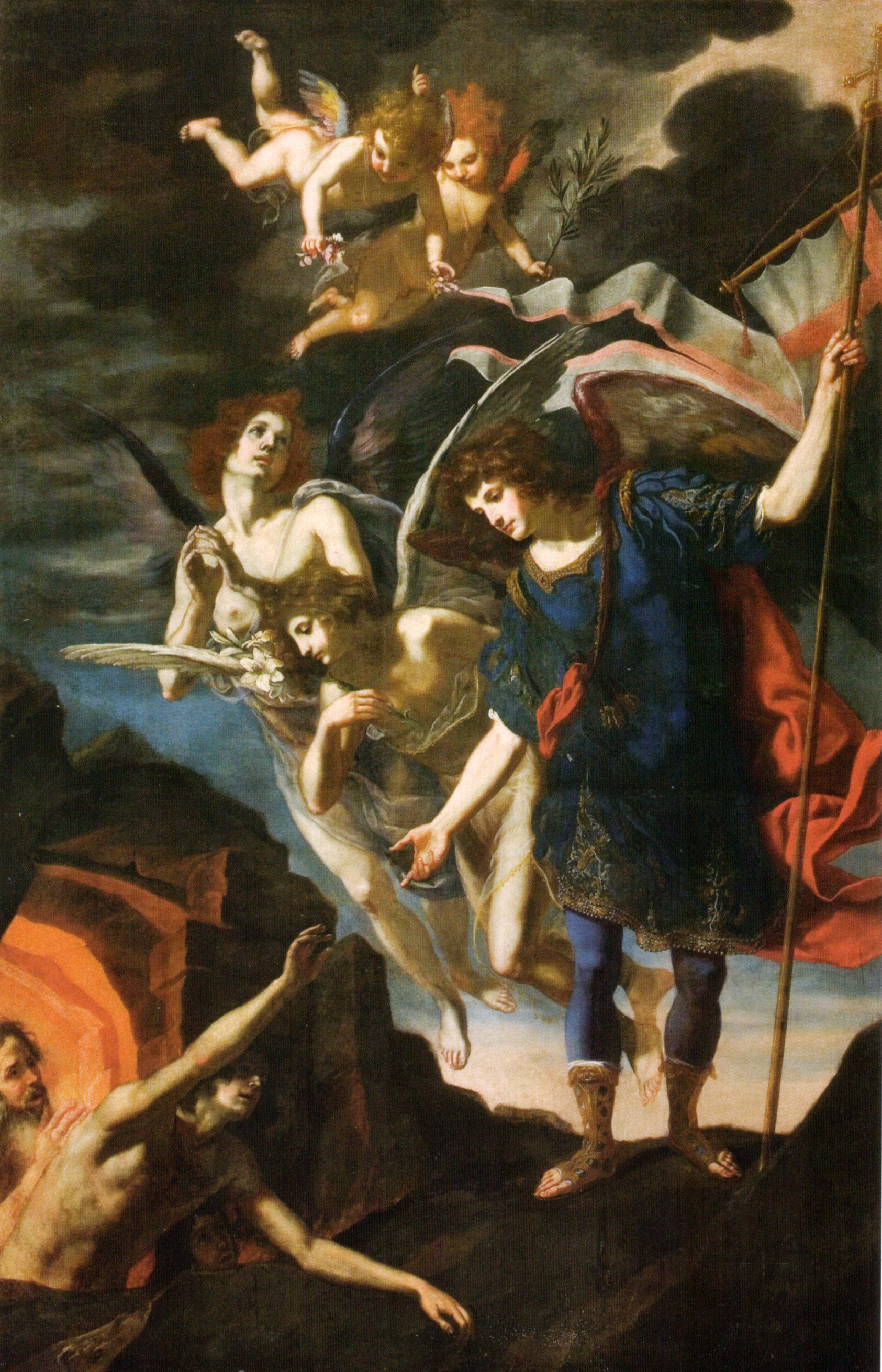
Archangel Michael reaching to free souls from Purgatory, by Jacopo Vignali 17th century

== See also ==
- Prayer to Saint Michael
- Saint Michael (Roman Catholic)

== Sources ==
- Mirabai Starr, Saint Michael: The Archangel, Published by Sounds True, 2007 ISBN 1-59179-627-X
- Susanna Magdalene Flavius, Litanies and Novenas for Your Salvation Published by Lulu.com, 2007 ISBN 1-84753-978-5
