= Robert (doll) =

Allegedly haunted doll

Robert the Doll
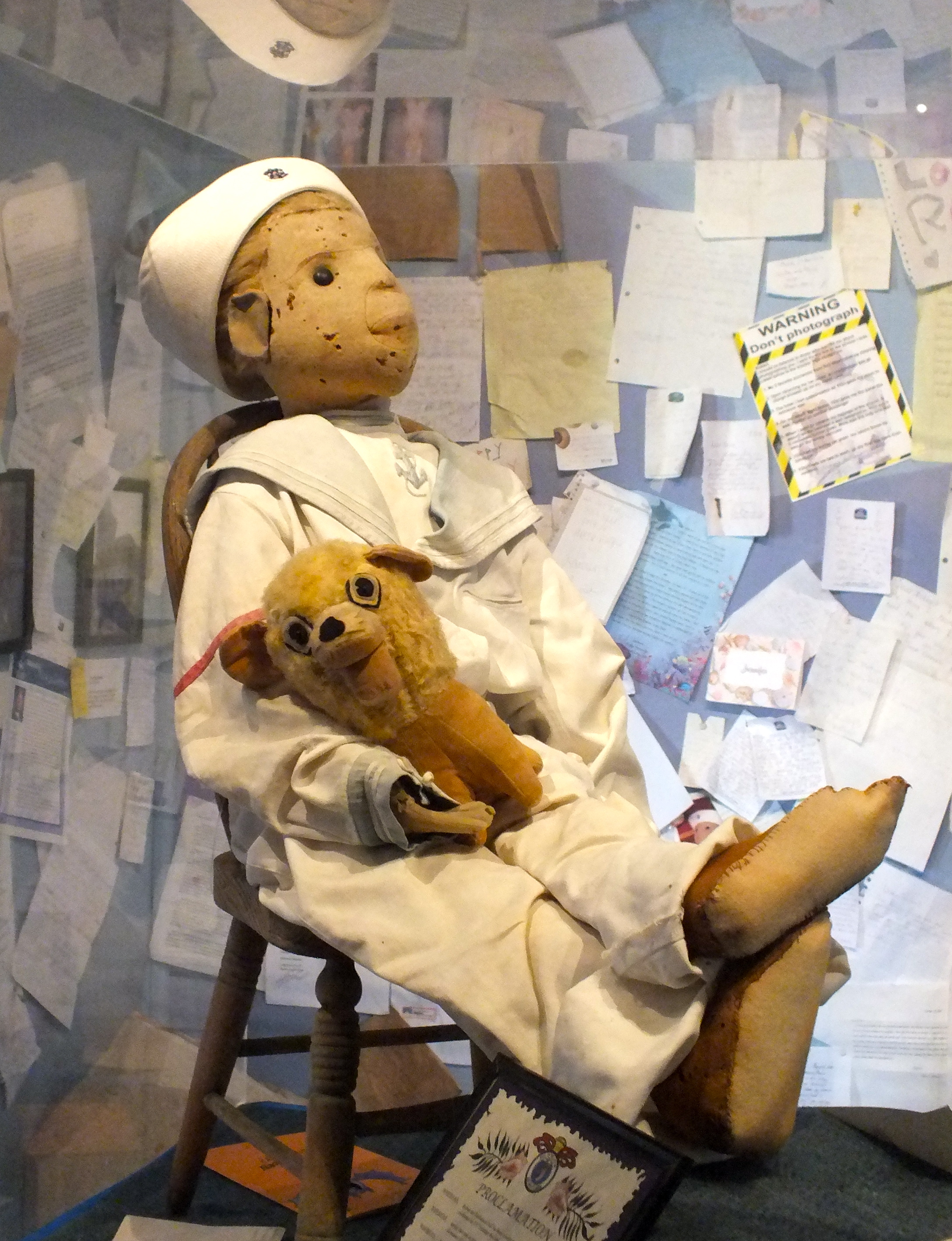
- Robert the Doll in 2011
- Material: Cloth and straw (assumed)
- Created: c. 1904
- Discovered: Key West, Florida, United States
- Present location: East Martello Museum, Key West, Florida
- Coordinates: 24.552389°N 81.754869°W
- Official page

Robert the Doll is a reportedly haunted doll exhibited at the East Martello Museum in Key West, Florida. He was once owned by painter, author, and Key West resident Robert Eugene Otto.

== History ==
The doll originally belonged to Robert Eugene Otto, an artist described as "eccentric", who belonged to a prominent Key West family. The doll was reportedly manufactured by the Steiff Company of Germany, purchased by Otto's grandfather while on a trip to Germany in 1904, and given to young Otto as a birthday gift. The doll's sailor suit was likely an outfit that Otto wore as a child.

The doll remained stored in the Otto family home at 534 Eaton Street in Key West while Otto studied art in New York and Paris. Otto married Annette Parker in Paris on May 3, 1930. The couple returned to the Otto family home in Key West to live there until Otto died in 1974. His wife died two years later. After their deaths, the Eaton Street home containing the doll was sold to Myrtle Reuter, who owned it for 20 years, until the property was sold to the current owners, who operate it as a guest house.

In 1994, the doll was donated to the East Martello Museum in Key West, where it became a popular tourist attraction.

== Legend ==
According to legend, the doll has supernatural abilities that allow it to move, change its facial expressions, and make giggling sounds. Some versions of the legend claim that a young girl of "Bahamian descent" gave Otto the doll as a gift or as "retaliation for a wrongdoing". Other stories claim that the doll moved voodoo figurines around the room and was "aware of what went on around him". Other legends claim that the doll "vanished" after Otto's house changed ownership several times after his death, or that young Otto triggered the doll's supernatural powers by blaming his childhood mishaps on the doll. According to local folklore, the doll has caused "car accidents, broken bones, job loss, divorce and a cornucopia of other misfortunes", and museum visitors supposedly experience "post-visit misfortunes" for "failing to respect Robert".

== In popular culture ==
- The doll was exhibited at TapsCON, a convention hosted by The Atlantic Paranormal Society in Clearwater, Florida, in May 2008, marking the first time it had left Key West in its then-104 years of existence.
- In October 2015, the doll was taken to Las Vegas for a Travel Channel television program in Zak Bagans' Haunted Museum. The episode originally aired on April 2, 2016, as the first episode of Deadly Possessions, and re-aired on August 12, 2017, as the first episode of Ghost Adventures: Artifacts.
- A horror film franchise loosely based on the legend began with the film Robert, released in 2015. Four sequels followed: The Curse of Robert the Doll in 2016, The Toymaker in 2017, The Legend of Robert the Doll in 2018, and Robert Reborn in 2019. A reboot film, titled Robert Returns, is scheduled to be released in 2027.
- The doll and a replica sold at the gift shop appeared in the second season of Ozzy & Jack's World Detour.
- The doll was featured in an episode of the podcast and TV series Lore.
- The doll, alongside its stuffed dog and owner, features in the LitRPG series Dungeon Crawler Carl.
