= The Ritual (2025 film) =

2025 horror film

- Theatrical release poster
- Directed by: David Midell
- Written by: Enrico Natale; David Midell
- Produced by: Enrico Natale; Ross Marks; Andrew Stevens; Mitchell Welch
- Starring: Al Pacino; Dan Stevens; Ashley Greene; Abigail Cowen; María Camila Giraldo; Meadow Williams; Patrick Fabian; Patricia Heaton
- Cinematography: Adam Biddle
- Edited by: Enrico Natale
- Music by: Jason Lazarus; Joseph Trapanese
- Production companies: Cinemachine Shop; Andrew Stevens Entertainment
- Distributed by: XYZ Films
- Release dates: May 30, 2025 (United Kingdom); June 6, 2025 (United States)
- Running time: 98 minutes
- Country: United States
- Language: English
- Box office: $5.7 million

The Ritual is a 2025 American horror film directed by David Midell and written by Midell and Enrico Natale. Based on a true story, it follows priests Theophilus Riesinger (Al Pacino) and Joseph Steiger (Dan Stevens) as they attempt to put aside their differences to save an allegedly possessed young woman Emma Schmidt (Abigail Cowen) through a series of exorcisms. The film was released by XYZ Films on June 6, 2025, and received generally negative reviews from critics.

== Plot ==
In 1928, in the quiet farming town of Earling, Iowa, a young woman named Emma Schmidt begins to suffer from terrifying and inexplicable supernatural phenomena. She is tormented by night terrors, violent outbursts, speaking in languages she does not know, and an unnatural hatred toward anything sacred. Her family, devout Catholic Christians, believes she is possessed and seek help from the Church. Their desperate plea reaches Father Theophilus Riesinger, a seasoned priest of the Capuchin religious order known for conducting exorcisms.

Riesinger travels to Iowa with a reluctant companion, Father Joseph Steiger, a younger priest. Steiger is skeptical of demonic possession, haunted by his brother’s recent suicide. Yet when he meets Emma and witnesses her inexplicable actions, his skepticism begins to erode.

The exorcisms take place at a convent attached to a parish church. Riesinger, who knew Emma in childhood, believes in the authenticity of the case and seeks to help her through the exorcisms, prayer, and talking. Emma is roomed upstairs and upon arrival to the church, demonstrates aversion to food that was prayed over. As the ritual begins, the house seems to change, the temperature drops, the air thickens, and Emma convulses. She begins to speak in multiple voices, some mocking and vile, others eerily calm. The demons reveal themselves as ancient unclean spirits, including Beelzebub, Judas Iscariot, and even Emma’s deceased father, a man who had abused her in life. The spirit of her aunt, rumored to have practiced witchcraft, also appears.

Exorcisms are conducted over a period of twenty-three days, in three major stages. During the same, Emma vomits strange substances, levitates, and speaks in Latin, German, Spanish, and Aramaic. Amidst the exorcisms for Emma, Steiger continues his priestly duty of offering daily Mass in the church. However, the toll on Steiger's health is noticed by the Mother superior. Steiger slowly finds renewed purpose in helping Emma and is seen wearing his St. Michael devotional medal, which has the Saint Benedict Medal on its reverse side.

During the final stage, Riesinger continues with intensity, while Steiger finally commits himself fully to the ritual. After Emma ran into the catacombs, the priests locate her and drive out the demons, demanding them to obey Christ. Many of the nuns at the convent simultaneously offer prayers for Emma. Then, she opens her eyes; the exorcism is complete and Emma is delivered from the demons. In the aftermath, Emma returns to a normal life, with both Riesinger being featured in the media and Steiger's journals being studied.

== Cast ==
- Al Pacino as Father Theophilus Riesinger
- Dan Stevens as Father Joseph Steiger
- Ashley Greene as Sister Rose
- Abigail Cowen as Emma Schmidt, a young woman who is allegedly experiencing demonic possession
- Patrick Fabian as Bishop Edwards
- Patricia Heaton as Mother Superior
- María Camila Giraldo as Sister Camila
- Meadow Williams as Sister Sarah
- Enrico Natale as Dr. Fabian
- Ritchie Montgomery as Chester

== Production ==
In July 2023, Al Pacino and Ben Foster signed on to star in the film. In January 2024, shooting commenced in Natchez, Mississippi. It was reported three months later that Foster had left the production, with Dan Stevens replacing him. The film is inspired by the 1935 book, Begone Satan!.

== Release ==
The Ritual was released in the United States by XYZ Films on June 6, 2025. It was originally scheduled to release on April 18, 2025. The film was first released in the United Kingdom and Ireland on May 30, 2025.

== Reception ==
=== Box office ===
The film released on June 6, 2025, alongside Ballerina, The Life of Chuck, I Don't Understand You and Dangerous Animals and earned $527,118 in domestic sales and $5,153,369 internationally grossing $5,680,487 worldwide.

=== Critical response ===
On the review aggregator website Rotten Tomatoes, 8% of 77 critics' reviews are positive, with an average rating of 3.4/10. The website's consensus reads: "The Ritual purportedly presents a real occult occurrence, but the most blasphemous thing about it may be wasting Al Pacino's talents on a clichéd story with uninspired execution." Metacritic, which uses a weighted average, assigned the film a score of 33 out of 100, based on 12 critics, indicating "generally unfavorable" reviews.

Leslie Felperin of The Guardian awarded the film two stars out of five. Jacob Oller of The A.V. Club graded the film a C−. Shawn Van Horn of Collider rated the film a 3 out of 10. Mark Hanson of Slant Magazine awarded the film half a star out of four. Christian Zilko of IndieWire graded the film a D. Meagan Navarro of Bloody Disgusting awarded the film one "skull" out of five. Craig D. Lindsey of RogerEbert.com awarded the film two stars out of four.

Joseph Holmes of Religion Unplugged rated the film positively, noting that "One of the movie’s greatest strengths comes from its faithfulness to the exorcism formula." Movieguide lauded the film, stating that "The Ritual is well filmed". The Catholic Review praised the film for treating the topic of exorcism with reverence.

Frank Scheck of The Hollywood Reporter gave the film a negative review and wrote as the bottom line: "Been there, exorcised that." Kyle Logan of ScreenAnarchy also gave the film a negative review, calling it "the kind of movie that's only going to be sought out by completionists in a couple years."

During a Q&A on Reddit, David Midell wrote "We definitely didn't make the film with critics in mind, we always knew it wouldn't be a favorite of theirs."
