= Kapsner =

Kapsner is a surname of German origin. Notable people with the surname include:

- Carol Ronning Kapsner (born 1947), American judge
- Celestine Kapsner (1892–1973), American priest
- Mary Kapsner (born 1973), American politician

== See also ==
- Kasner
