= Robert the Doll (film series) =

- Film logo
- Based on: Concept developed by Andrew Jones
- Starring: Lee Bane
- Cinematography: Jonathan McLaughlin
- Edited by: Andrew Jones
- Music by: Bobby Cole
- Production company: North Bank Entertainment
- Distributed by: 4Digital Media; Take One; Great Movies; Frighten Entertainment; Eurofilms; Campaolo Films; Encripta; Netflix; Red Square; Sony Pictures Home Entertainment; White Pearl Movies
- Country: United Kingdom
- Language: English
- Box office: $19,096

Robert or Robert the Doll is a British supernatural B-horror film franchise created by Andrew Jones that has been produced by North Bank Entertainment since 2015. The films in the franchise include Robert (2015), The Curse of Robert the Doll (2016), The Toymaker (2017), The Legend of Robert the Doll (2018) and a prequel Robert Reborn (2019) as the last film created by Andrew Jones before he died in January 2023. All of the original films in the franchise were written and directed by Andrew Jones. In June 2026, a reboot entitled Robert Returns was announced by Flickering Myth and Shepka Productions.

== Films ==
Overview of Robert the Doll films
Film	U.S. release date	Director(s)	Writer(s)		Producers
Film	U.S. release date	Director(s)	Screenplay by	Story by	Producers
Original series
Robert	August 24, 2015	Andrew Jones	Andrew Jones	Andrew Jones	Andrew Jones
The Curse of Robert the Doll	September 12, 2016	Andrew Jones	Andrew Jones	Andrew Jones	Lee Bane, Andrew Jones
The Toymaker	August 21, 2017	Andrew Jones	Andrew Jones	Andrew Jones	Lee Bane, Andrew Jones, Rebecca Graham
The Legend of Robert the Doll	March 6, 2018	Andrew Jones	Andrew Jones	Andrew Jones	Lee Bane, Andrew Jones, Rebecca Graham
Robert Reborn	June 24, 2019	Andrew Jones	Andrew Jones	Andrew Jones	Harry Willis, Andrew Jones, Rebecca Graham, Tom Willis
Reboot
Robert Returns	TBA	Nathan Shepka	Nathan Shepka	TBA	Gary Collinson, Nathan Shepka

=== Robert (2015) ===
It stars Suzie Frances Garton, Lee Bane, Flynn Allen, Judith Haley and Megan Lockhurst. The film was inspired by a haunted doll named Robert.

4Digital Media acquired the distribution of the film in UK and US and was released on 24 August 2015.

=== The Curse of Robert the Doll (2016) ===
It stars Jason Homewood, Nigel Barber, Chris Bell and Lee Bane. The film is about a young woman confronts the cursed Robert doll when she becomes the new custodian at a museum where the deadly toy is displayed.

The film was released in United Kingdom on September 12, 2016, and was released in VOD, DVD and Blu-ray on June 30, 2017.

=== The Toymaker (2017) ===
is a 2017 British supernatural horror film written and directed by Andrew Jones. A sequel to the (2016) film The Curse of Robert the Doll and (2015) film Robert and a third installment to the Robert the Doll film series. It stars Erick Hayden, Jo Weil, Nathan Head, Lee Bane and Sophie Willis. The film is about the Nazis pursuing a Toymaker who has acquired a mystical book which gives life to inanimate objects.

The film was released nationwide on August 21, 2017, and was released in DVD on September 5, 2017. The film also released in Netflix on April 30, 2022.

=== The Legend of Robert the Doll (2018) ===
is a 2018 British supernatural horror film written and directed by Andrew Jones. It is a sequel to the (2017) film The Toymaker, (2016) film The Curse of Robert the Doll and (2015) film Robert and a fourth installment to the Robert the Doll film series. It stars Lee Bane, Harriet Rees, Judith Haley, Eloise Juryeff and Gareth Lawrence.

Cast and crew are started filming on August 8, 2017, and wrapped on August 20, 2017.

=== Robert Reborn (2019) ===
is a 2019 British B-horror film written and directed by Andrew Jones. A prequel to the 2015 film Robert and a fifth installment in the Robert the Doll film series.

Robert Reborn was the final film of director Andrew Jones, who died on January 15, 2023.

=== Reboot ===
==== Robert Returns (2027) ====
is a 2027 British B-horror film and a reboot of the Robert the Doll film series. Written and directed by Nathan Shepka, it is produced by Flickering Myth and Shepka Productions.

== Main cast and characters ==
Character	Films				
Character	Robert	The Curse of Robert the Doll	The Toymaker	The Legend of Robert the Doll	Robert Reborn
The Toymaker / Paul Otto	Lee Bane	Lee Bane	Lee Bane	Lee Bane	Lee Bane
Jenny Otto	Suzie Frances Garton	Suzie Frances Garton			
Gene Otto	Flynn Allen				
Agatha	Judith Haley			Judith Haley	
Kevin Underwood		Jason Homewood			
Walter Berenson		Nigel Barber			
Officer Sardy		Chris Bell			
Emily Barker		Tiffany Ceri			
Detective Bill Atkins		Steven Dolton			
Colonel Ludolf Von Alvensleben			Erick Hayden		
Officer Hermann Fegelein			Jo Weil		
Officer Heinrich Berger			Nathan Head		
Elisabeth			Sophie Willis		
Officer Karl Gebhardt			Bodo Friesecke		
Esther Muller			Harriet Rees	Harriet Rees	
Brigitte Muller			Ali Rodney		
Eva Von Hammersmark				Eloise Juryeff	
Frederick Voller				Gareth Lawrence	
Joseph Von Hammersmark				David Imper	
Colonel Heinrich Von Braun				Nicholas Anscombe	
Adler					David Lenik
Pilot					John R. Walker
Peters					Brendan Purcell
Petrov					Peter Svatik
Olga					Lux Kapsaski
Dr. Mikhailov					Jon Bard

== Crew and details ==
Title	Crew and details				
Title	Editor(s)	Cinematographer	Production companies	Distributing companies	Running time
Original series
Robert	Morgan Conlon	Jonathan McLaughlin	North Bank Entertainment	4Digital Media	90 minutes
The Curse of Robert the Doll	Andrew Jones	Jonathan McLaughlin	North Bank Entertainment	4Digital Media, Take One, Great Movies, Frighten Entertainment, Eurofilms, Campaolo Films, Encripta	79 minutes
The Toymaker	Andrew Jones	Jonathan McLaughlin	North Bank Entertainment	4Digital Media, Take One Great Movies, Frighten Entertainment, Sony Pictures Home Entertainment, Red Square, Encripta	84 minutes
The Legend of Robert the Doll	Andrew Jones	Jonathan McLaughlin	North Bank Entertainment	4Digital Media, Take One Great Movies, Frighten Entertainment, Netflix, White Pearl Movies, Encripta	80 minutes
Robert Reborn	Andrew Jones	Jonathan McLaughlin	North Bank Entertainment	4Digital Media, Netflix	85 minutes
Reboot
Robert Returns	Nathan Shepka	Thomas Adams	Flickering Myth, Shepka Productions, IMP Studios	4Digital Media	TBA
