= The Toymaker (film) =

2017 horror film directed by Andrew Jones

- Official release poster
- Directed by: Andrew Jones
- Written by: Andrew Jones
- Produced by: Lee Bane; Andrew Jones; Rebecca Graham
- Starring: Erick Hayden; Jo Weil; Nathan Head; Lee Bane; Sophie Willis
- Cinematography: Jonathan McLaughlin
- Edited by: Andrew Jones
- Music by: Bobby Cole
- Production company: North Bank Entertainment
- Distributed by: 4Digital Media; Take One; Great Movies; Frighten Entertainment; Sony Pictures Home Entertainment; Red Square; Encripta
- Release date: 21 August 2017 (United Kingdom)
- Running time: 84 minutes
- Country: United Kingdom
- Language: English

The Toymaker (also known as Robert and the Toymaker) is a 2017 British supernatural horror film written and directed by Andrew Jones. A prequel to the 2015 film Robert and 2016's The Curse of Robert the Doll, it is the third installment in the Robert the Doll film series. It stars Erick Hayden, Jo Weil, Nathan Head, Lee Bane and Sophie Willis. The film is about the Nazis pursuing a Toymaker who has acquired a mystical book which gives life to inanimate objects.

== Plot ==
Set in Nazi Germany, 1941, the story begins with a rogue Nazi officer, Benjamin Hoffman, who steals a powerful occult book said to contain ancient rituals that can bring objects to life. Hoffman is pursued by the SS, led by the ruthless Colonel Reinhard, who is obsessed with harnessing supernatural power for Hitler’s war machine.

Hoffman hides the book in the remote village of Rosenheim, where it eventually ends up in the hands of Amos Blackwood, a reclusive and mysterious toymaker. Using the arcane rituals in the book, Amos brings several of his dolls and wooden toys to life, most notably the terrifying Robert the Doll, who becomes the guardian of his workshop.

Soon after, the SS tracks the book to Amos's toyshop. During their investigation, one officer discovers Robert moving on his own, and is later found dead, his eyes gouged out and body dismembered by Robert and the other animated toys. His blood stains the walls of the shop’s storage room, and the authorities suspect foul play, but they cannot explain the murder.

A treacherous assistant, lured by Nazi promises, betrays Amos. The SS storm the shop, violently arresting Amos and taking the occult book. They plan to use the ritual to create an army of living weapons. Robert, hidden and watching, begins his bloody rampage of revenge.

As night falls, Robert and the other toys silently infiltrate the SS base where Amos is imprisoned. The first victim is a guard who hears whispers in the hallway; Robert appears from the shadows and slashes his throat with a sharpened toy blade. Another soldier is ambushed by a wooden soldier doll, who plunges a miniature bayonet into his neck repeatedly.

The killings become more vicious: one Nazi is strapped to a workbench and tortured by toy tools, while another is set on fire by an exploding mechanical bear. The dolls use their small size and speed to sneak through air vents and tight corridors, attacking from unexpected angles and leaving chaos in their wake.

Colonel Reinhard attempts to use the book’s magic himself, but it backfires. The toys turn on him, with Robert leading the charge, slicing the Colonel's abdomen open and leaving him screaming as he's pulled apart by several dolls. Amos is finally rescued by his creations.

Amos flees into the countryside, the book in his possession again. Robert and the other toys surround him protectively. Their eyes gleam with life and menace as the implication lingers that the horrors are far from over.

== Cast ==
- Erick Hayden as Colonel Ludolf Von Alvensleben
- Jo Weil as Officer Hermann Fegelein
- Nathan Head as Officer Heinrich Berger
- Lee Bane as The Toymaker
- Sophie Willis as Elisabeth
- Bodo Friesecke as Officer Karl Gebhardt
- Claire Carreno as Abigail Kendrick
- Rik Grayson as Benjamin Hoffman
- Harriet Rees as Esther Muller
- Ali Rodney as Brigitte Muller
- Francesco Tribuzio as Christophe Muller
- Jonathan Willis as Josef
- Robert Graham as Wilhelm
- Courtney Bartle as Francesca

== Production ==
=== Filming ===
Filming took place in November 2016 at Tredomen Cottage in Crickhowell and at the Traditional Toys shop in Llantrisant, the Old Natwest Bank building in Bute Street Cardiff, Gwili Railway Station in Carmarthen and the Cardiff Masonic Hall.

== Release ==
The film was released nationwide on 21 August 2017, and was released in DVD on 5 September 2017. The film also released in Netflix on 30 April 2022.

== Reception ==
Moria Reviews gave the film a rating of 2 stars and wrote: "I found The Toymaker a somewhat better film than Robert the Doll. That said, it is past the one-hour point before we get to see Robert. It is still the same scrawny immobile puppet it was in the first film, although this time it gets to be accompanied by a couple of other dolls."

Culture Crypt gave the film a negative review and giving the film a review score of 20 and wrote: "Even though it rips off what Full Moon already did with its "Puppet Master" series, "Robert and the Toymaker's" dolls versus Nazis theme should create a playground for midnight movie madness. Yet it ends up being even more intolerably stale and un-fun than the two movies that came before."

== Sequels ==
The Legend of Robert the Doll was released on 6 March 2018, and Robert Reborn on 24 June 2019.
