= The Exorcism of Anna Ecklund =

- Film poster
- Directed by: Andrew Jones
- Written by: Andrew Jones
- Produced by: Andrew Jones; Emily Coupland; Steve Beecham
- Starring: Jeff Raggett; Lee Bane; Tiffany Ceri
- Cinematography: Jonathan McLaughlin
- Edited by: Andrew Jones
- Music by: Bobby Cole
- Production company: Masterplan Film Productions
- Release date: 7 March 2016
- Running time: 76 minutes
- Country: United Kingdom
- Language: English
- Box office: $43,300

The Exorcism of Anna Ecklund is a 2016 British horror film written and directed by Andrew Jones. The plot is based on the alleged true story of Anna Ecklund.

== Plot ==
A local priest and an investigator from the Vatican team up to help discover whether a formerly gentle wife and mother is truly possessed by an ancient evil. Upon realizing that this is the case, the two try to take the woman, Anna Ecklund, to a convent to perform an exorcism. Unwilling to let its prey loose, the evil launches an assault against the priests.

== Cast ==
- Jeff Raggett as Father Theophilus Riesinger
- Lee Bane as Father Richard Lamont
- Tiffany Ceri as Anna Ecklund
- Rik Grayson as Jacob Ecklund
- Claire Carreno as Sister Abigail
- Sarah Tempest as Sister Madeline
- Melissa Bayern as Laura
- Stefano Reali as Monsignor Lamberto
- Judith Haley as Mother Superior

== Production ==
Filming took place in Mumbles, Wales. Tiffany Ceri was brought on to play the titular character of Anna Ecklund. She found the role interesting "because it was so varied" and that "The scenes were quite crazy and manic and took up a lot of energy and physical strength as well. There was a lot of screaming and shouting and I decided to stay in character which was hard because it was so intense."

== Release ==
The Exorcism of Anna Ecklund was released in the United Kingdom on 7 March 2016. The film was later released in the United States on 5 April of the same year.

== Reception ==
Film critic Samantha McLaren of Scream was critical of the movie, writing that "Clocking in at just seventy-five minutes, at least fifteen of which were eaten up by long and boring opening and closing credits and even more by its endless padding scenes, The Exorcism of Anna Ecklund barely feels like a film at all." The reviewer for HorrorNews.net was also critical, negatively comparing it to The Exorcist and stating that viewers should "Pass on this timid and tiresome film that adds nothing to the possession genre and go watch the original “The Exorcist” again."

Jason Rhode of Cryptic Rock was more favorable, opining in their review that "Ultimately, The Exorcism of Anna Ecklund is interesting since it is based on a true story, flows evenly, and has a solid soundtrack. However, as stated, the plot has been done, so unless this scenario’s common for all exorcisms, audiences might give it cursory watch; then, put in The Exorcism of Emily Rose. Nonetheless, Horror fans who dig films about demonic possession should absolutely check the film out."

The film received negative reviews on IMDb and per Screen Rant, was one of the ten lowest rated horror films as of 2019, summarizing by writing "If you're wondering what makes this movie different from the other exorcism movies, the answer is nothing. As one viewer wrote on the IMDb page, "Girl is possessed, priests get 'clearance' to perform exorcism, demon possesses the priests, rinse and repeat.""
