= Collegeville Township, Stearns County, Minnesota =

Collegeville Township, Minnesota
- Township
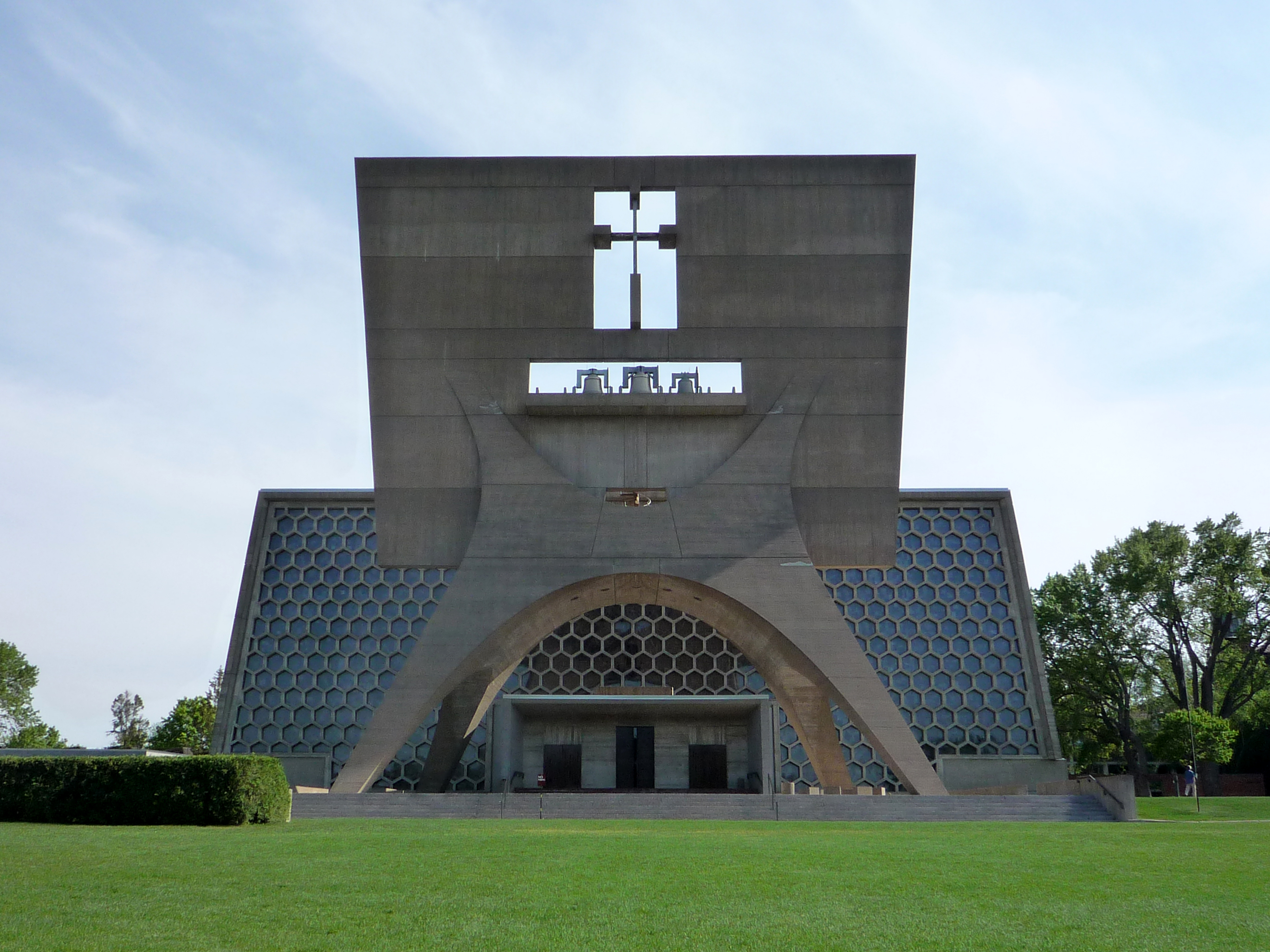
- Saint John's Abbey Church on the campus of Saint John's University
- Motto: "In the heart Of Stearns County"
- Location within the state of Minnesota Collegeville Township, Minnesota (the United States)
- Coordinates: 45°33′N 94°27′W
- Country: United States
- State: Minnesota
- County: Stearns

Area
  - Total: 35.1 sq mi (90.9 km^{2})
  - Land: 31.7 sq mi (82.0 km^{2})
  - Water: 3.4 sq mi (8.9 km^{2})
- Elevation: 1,171 ft (357 m)

Population (2020)
  - Total: 3,344
  - Density: 111/sq mi (42.9/km^{2})
- Time zone: UTC-6 (Central (CST))
  - Summer (DST): UTC-5 (CDT)
- ZIP code: 56321
- Area code: 320
- FIPS code: 27-12592
- GNIS feature ID: 0663847
- Website: https://www.collegevilletownship.com/

Collegeville Township is a township in Stearns County, Minnesota, United States. The population was 3,344 at the 2020 census.

== History ==
Collegeville Township was organized by European Americans in 1880, and named after Saint John's College.

== Geography ==
According to the United States Census Bureau, the township has a total area of 35.1 square miles (91 km^{2}), of which 31.6 square miles (82 km^{2}) is land and 3.5 square miles (9.1 km^{2}) (9.83%) is water.

Collegeville Township is located in Township 124 North of the Arkansas Base Line and Range 30 West of the 5th Principal Meridian.

== Demographics ==
Historical population
Census	Pop.	Note	%±
1880	318		—
1890	506		59.1%
1900	655		29.4%
1910	606		−7.5%
1920	777		28.2%
1930	869		11.8%
1940	892		2.6%
1950	1,457		63.3%
1960	1,812		24.4%
1970	2,371		30.8%
1980	3,075		29.7%
1990	1,624		−47.2%
2000	3,516		116.5%
2010	3,343		−4.9%
2020	3,344		0.0%
U.S. Decennial Census

As of the census of 2000, there were 3,516 people, 29% of those being Monks at the present Abbey and Monastery. 569 households, and 397 families residing in the township. The population density was 111.1 inhabitants per square mile (42.9/km^{2}). There were 721 housing units at an average density of 22.8/sq mi (8.8/km^{2}). The racial makeup of the township was 97.07% White, 0.63% African American, 0.06% Native American, 1.56% Asian, 0.03% Pacific Islander, 0.34% from other races, and 0.31% from two or more races. Hispanics and Latinos of any race were 0.85% of the population.

There were 669 households, out of which 39.6% had children under the age of 18 living with them, 78.0% were married couples living together, 2.7% had a female householder with no husband present, and 16.4% were non-families. 12.3% of all households were made up of individuals, and 2.4% had someone living alone who was 65 years of age or older. The average household size was 2.85 and the average family size was 3.11.

The age distribution was 16.7% under the age of 18, 41.6% from 18 to 24, 16.8% from 25 to 44, 18.2% from 45 to 64, and 6.6% who were 65 years of age or older. The median age was 22 years. For every 100 females, there were 261.0 males. For every 100 females age 18 and over, there were 320.8 males.

The median income for a household in the township was $61,146, and the median income for a family was $62,750. Males had a median income of $36,926 versus $27,391 for females. The per capita income for the township was $18,348. About 0.6% of families and 6.0% of the population were below the poverty line, including 1.1% of those under age 18 and 2.3% of those age 65 or over.

== Arts and culture ==
=== Museums and other points of interest ===
- Saint John's Arboretum
- Saint John's University
- Saint John's Abbey

== Education ==
The township is home to Saint John's Abbey and Saint John's University, a Roman Catholic all-male university.

== Infrastructure ==
=== Transportation ===
Main routes in the community include Stearns County Roads 50, 51, 159 and 160.

== Notable people ==
- Fr. Celestine Kapsner, OSB, Catholic priest and exorcist
- J. F. Powers, National Book Award for Fiction-winning novelist
- Marcel Breuer, a famous architect from New York, here to design the new Saint John's Abbey and University Church.
