= Haunted doll =

Cursed or possessed doll

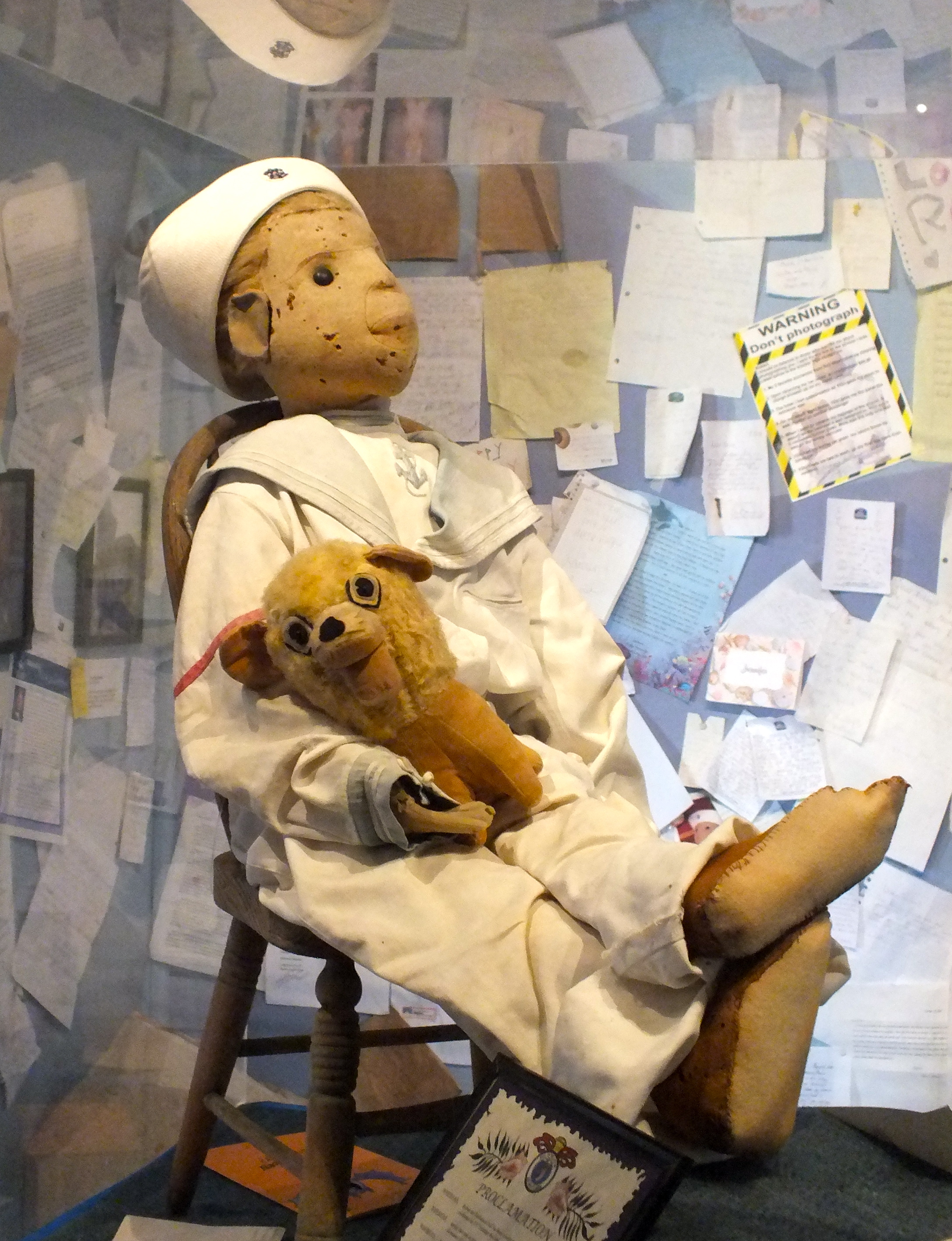
Robert the doll

A haunted doll is a handmade or manufactured doll or stuffed toy that is claimed to be cursed or possessed in some way.

== History ==
According to Linda Rodriguez McRobbie, the concept of malevolent dolls gained attention in the 20th century when film and entertainment technology was able to realistically portray "safely inanimate" dolls as "dangerously animate". McRobbie cites examples such as the 1936 film The Devil-Doll by Tod Browning, the Living Doll episode of the TV series The Twilight Zone, the clown doll from the film Poltergeist, the Chucky doll featured in the Child's Play film franchise, as well as "B-movie variations on the homicidal doll theme" such as Dolly Dearest, Puppet Master, Demonic Toys, and Blood Dolls. More recently, a character based on the doll named Annabelle owned by Ed and Lorraine Warren has been featured in The Conjuring series of films.

The popularity of films and entertainment about haunted dolls has resulted in the sale of dolls claimed to be haunted on eBay, Amazon, Etsy and many other sites. According to Katherine Carlson of The New Yorker, sales listings are often accompanied by claims of paranormal phenomena associated with the doll. Carlson wrote that such dolls bring with them a certain fascination that a regular doll does not, since "a haunted doll requires proof — or at least enough of a backstory that a prospective buyer can embrace the possibility of the supernatural".

According to folklore professor Libby Tucker, "Ghost tours, ads for haunted hotels, and other monetary transactions build on preexisting beliefs and narratives. The fact that people buy and sell ghostly materials takes nothing away from these materials' value for folklore researchers, which is considerable".

== Notable haunted dolls ==
A number of supposedly haunted dolls have appeared in popular culture in recent years.

=== Robert ===
Robert is a doll claimed to be possessed by spirits that is on display at the East Martello Museum in Key West, Florida, that was once owned by Key West painter and author Robert Eugene Otto.

=== Annabelle ===
Annabelle is a Raggedy Ann doll alleged by Ed and Lorraine Warren to be haunted and displayed in The Warren's Occult Museum in Monroe, Connecticut, the United States. The doll served as the inspiration for the films The Conjuring and Annabelle.

=== Letta the Doll ===
Kerry Walton, of Brisbane, Queensland, Australia, has appeared on a number of television programs with a doll he claims to have found while visiting an abandoned building in 1972 in Wagga Wagga. According to Walton, he named the doll "Letta Me Out" because of its supposedly supernatural characteristics. Walton claims that people have seen the doll move in front of them, and that the doll has left scuff marks around the house.

=== Okiku ===
According to modern Japanese folklore, in 1918, a teenager named Eikichi Suzuki purchased a large doll from Hokkaido for his younger sister, Okiku, who gave the doll her name. When Okiku died, her family came to believe that Okiku's spirit was inhabiting the doll and the hair on the doll was growing. The doll resides in Mannenji Temple in Hokkaido, where it is claimed that a priest regularly trims Okiku's still-growing hair.

=== Mandy ===
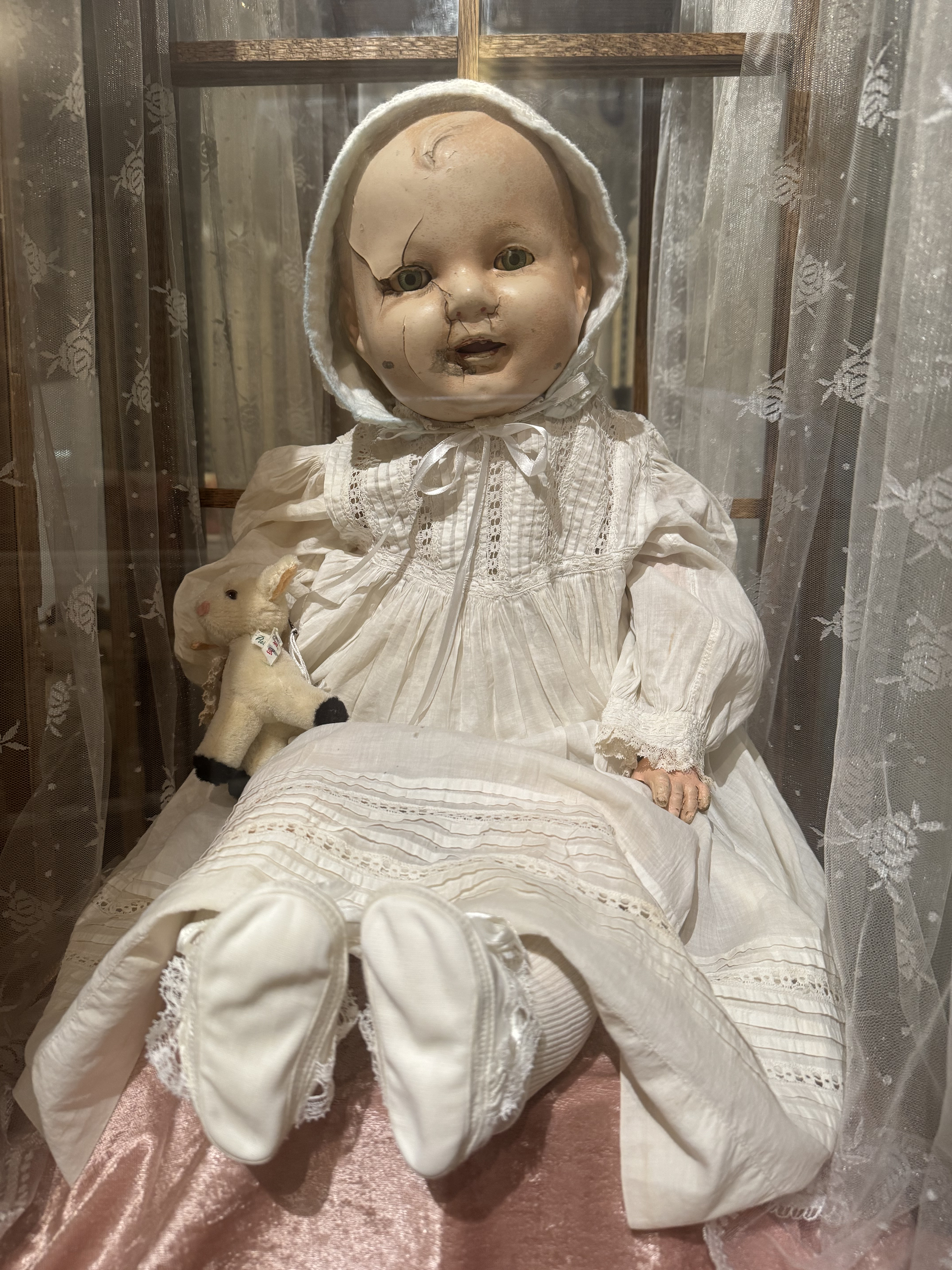
Closeup of Mandy The Doll in her display case at Quesnel & District Museum and Archives

Made in England or Germany between 1910 and 1920, Mandy is a porcelain baby doll donated to the Quesnel Museum in British Columbia in 1991 that is claimed to have supernatural powers: Mandy's eyes supposedly follow museum visitors. The doll has been featured on the Montel Williams Show.

=== Pupa ===
Pupa is a felt doll wearing a light blue dress and bow, rumored to have real human hair. According to legend, the doll was made in the 1920s and was made to resemble the 5-year-old girl who owned it until her death in 2005. It is claimed that family members kept the doll in a glass case and reported that the doll would tap on the glass, move, and leave messages on the glass.

=== Pulau Ubin Barbie ===
According to Singapore legend, Pulau Ubin Barbie is a Barbie doll displayed in a memorial temple said to have supernatural powers.

=== After Midnight dolls ===
Late night comedy panel show After Midnight features a haunted doll as a recurring prize.

=== Fofão ===
Sold in Brazil in the late 1980s, the doll was based on the children's show character of the same name. They became the target of urban legends claiming that they contained a knife or dagger inside their bodies used for rituals and to curse children.

=== Xuxa ===
As with Fofão, this was sold in the late 1980s and based on children's show host Xuxa. One doll became the target of a rumor claiming it had been possessed by the devil and had killed a child. At least one such report appeared in a newspaper.

=== Elizabeth ===
Elizabeth is a bridal doll associated with alleged paranormal activity in the United Kingdom. The doll gained media attention after paranormal investigator Lee Steer documented claims of unexplained scratches and disturbances connected to the doll. Elizabeth later appeared on ITV's This Morning, where the programme described claims surrounding the doll and its alleged effect on Lee Steer's relationship.

== See also ==
- Iki doll
- Killer toy
- Voodoo doll
