= Segne, Vater, diese Gaben =

Christian hymn

- Christian hymn
- English: Bless, Father, these gifts
- Occasion: Grace
- Written: 20th century
- Language: German
- Published: 2001

"Segne, Vater, diese Gaben" (Bless, Father, these gifts) is a Christian hymn. The authors of text and melody are unknown. It is meant to be sung as a round. The song, which is often used for a prayer before a meal, has appeared in German hymnals and songbooks. It is regarded as a song of the genre Neues Geistliches Lied (NGL), and has been used in schools and events for young people.

== History ==
It is unknown who created the text, of one line followed by a twofold Amen, and the melody of "Segne, Vater, diese Gaben". The song is a prayer to bless gifts in general, but is mostly used as a prayer before a meal, saying grace. It is a round for two voices. The song was included in the 2013 German Catholic hymnal Gotteslob as GL 88, in the section Tischgebete (Grace), also with an alternate text: "Dank dir, Vater, für die Gaben" (Thank you, Father, for the gifts). It is regarded as a song of the genre Neues Geistliches Lied (NGL), from the 20th century. The song was also printed in other songbooks, including the popular Die Mundorgel, a collection of Fahrtenlieder (2001). It has been recommended for use in elementary schools, and is listed among successful in youth services. The song is part of the collection Kinder-Kirchen-Hits (Children's Church Hits), a songbook aimed at children in kindergarten, elementary schools, and for services for children and young people.

The first line is the title of a collection of prayers around a meal edited by Stephan Schaefer, and published by Verlag Neue Stadt in 2012. The same publishing house added a selection of graces in pocket format by Gabriele Hartl, titled Segne, Vater, diese Gaben. Tischgebete, in 2021.
