= Grace (meals) =

Type of short prayer

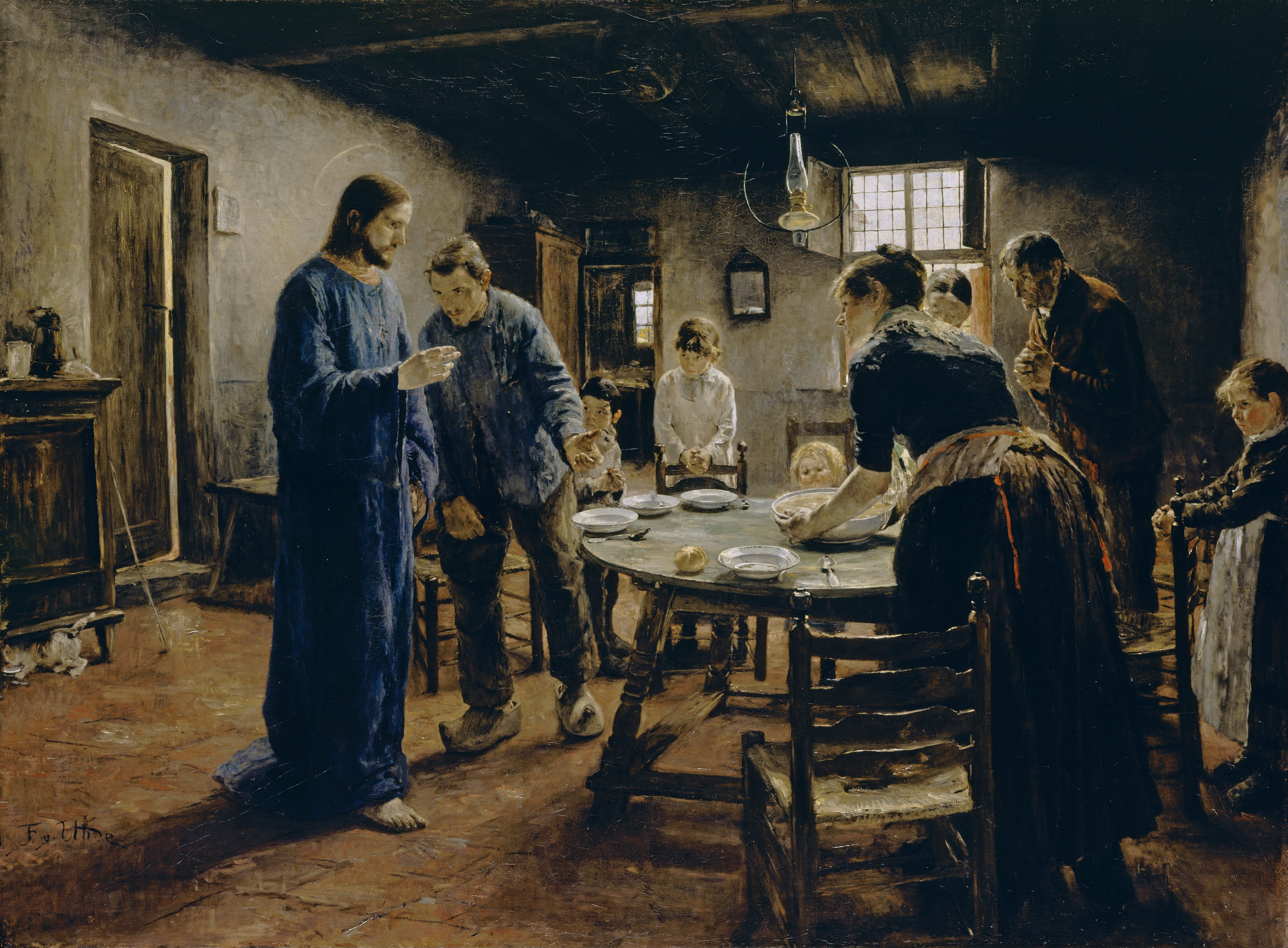
Grace before the Meal, by Fritz von Uhde, 1885.

A grace is a short prayer or thankful phrase said before or after eating. The term most commonly refers to Christian traditions. Some traditions hold that grace and thanksgiving imparts a blessing, which sanctifies the meal. In English, reciting such a prayer is sometimes called "saying grace". The term comes from the Ecclesiastical Latin phrase gratiarum actio 'act of thanks'. Theologically, the act of saying grace is derived from the Bible in which Jesus and Saint Paul pray before meals (cf. Luke 24:30, Acts 27:35). The practice reflects the belief that humans should thank God who is believed to be the origin of everything.

== Christianity ==
A family saying grace at a 1942 American Thanksgiving dinner

Pope Francis suggested "all believers ... return to [the] beautiful and meaningful custom" of stopping to "give thanks to God before and after meals".

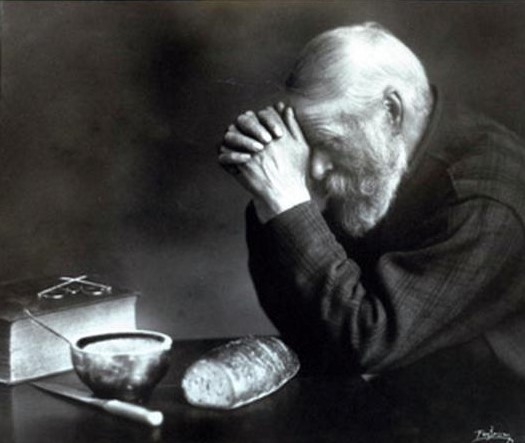
Grace by Eric Enstrom

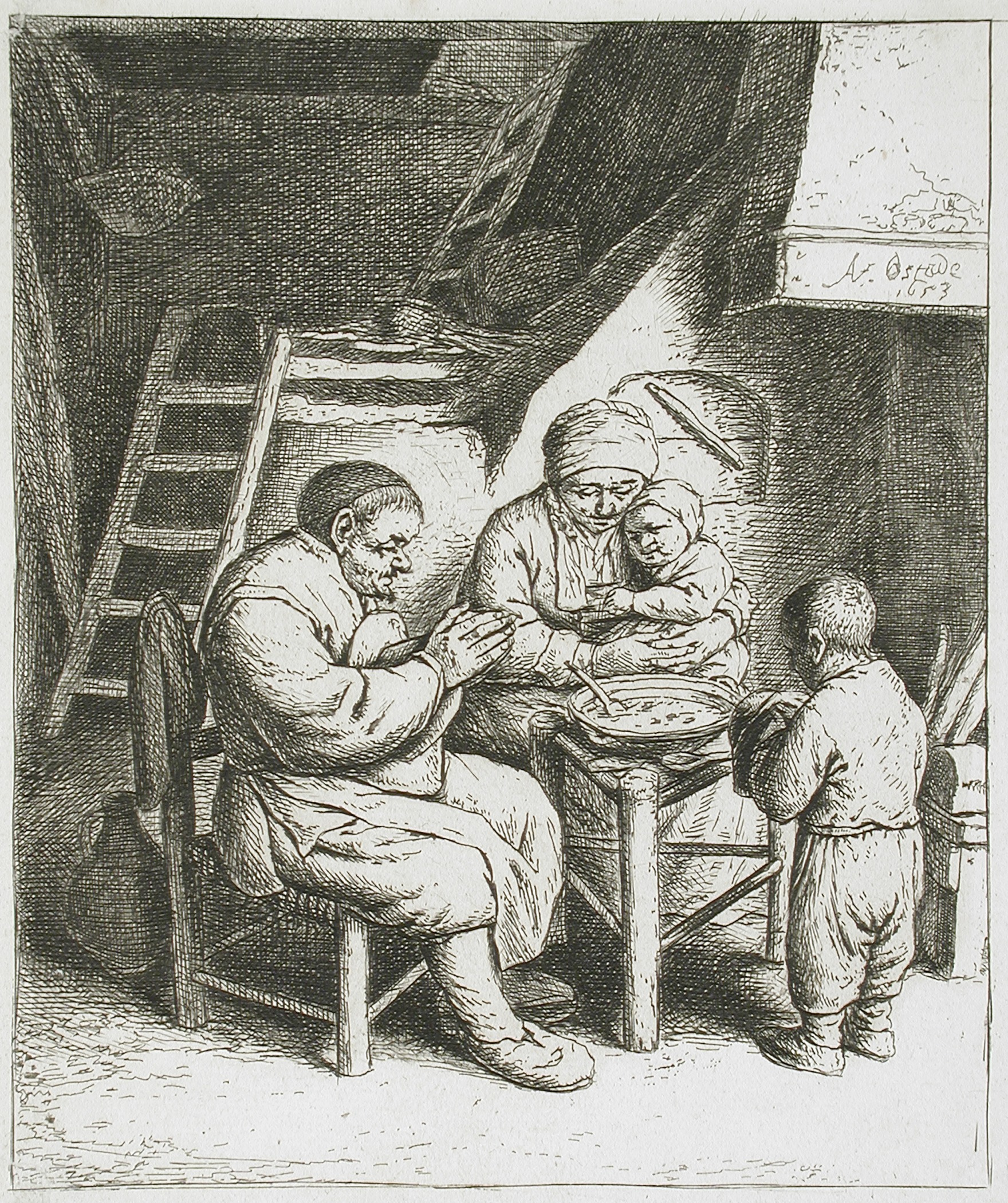
Saying Grace by Dutch painter Adriaen van Ostade, 1653.

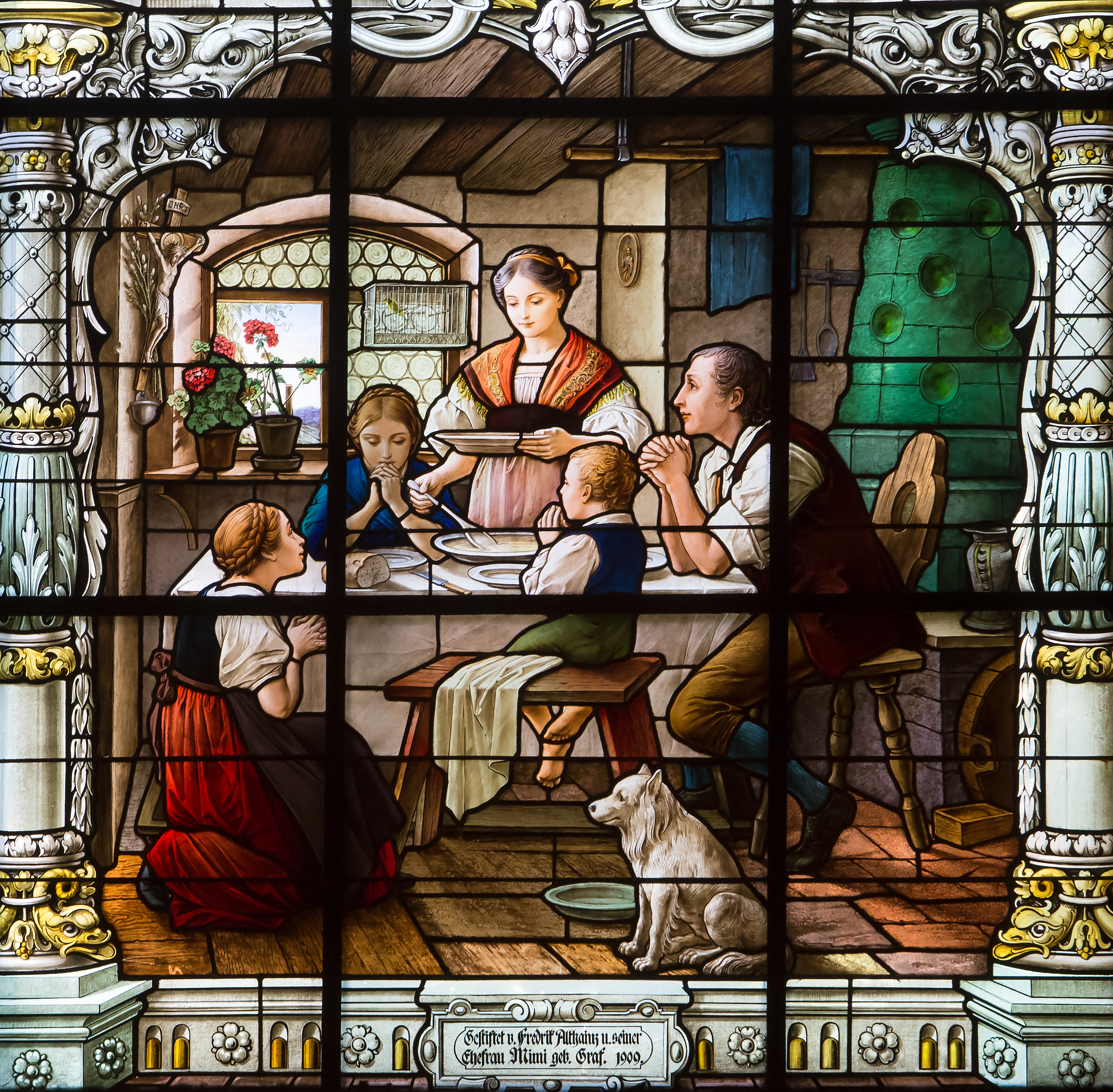
Stained glass depicting family saying grace, German Church, Stockholm

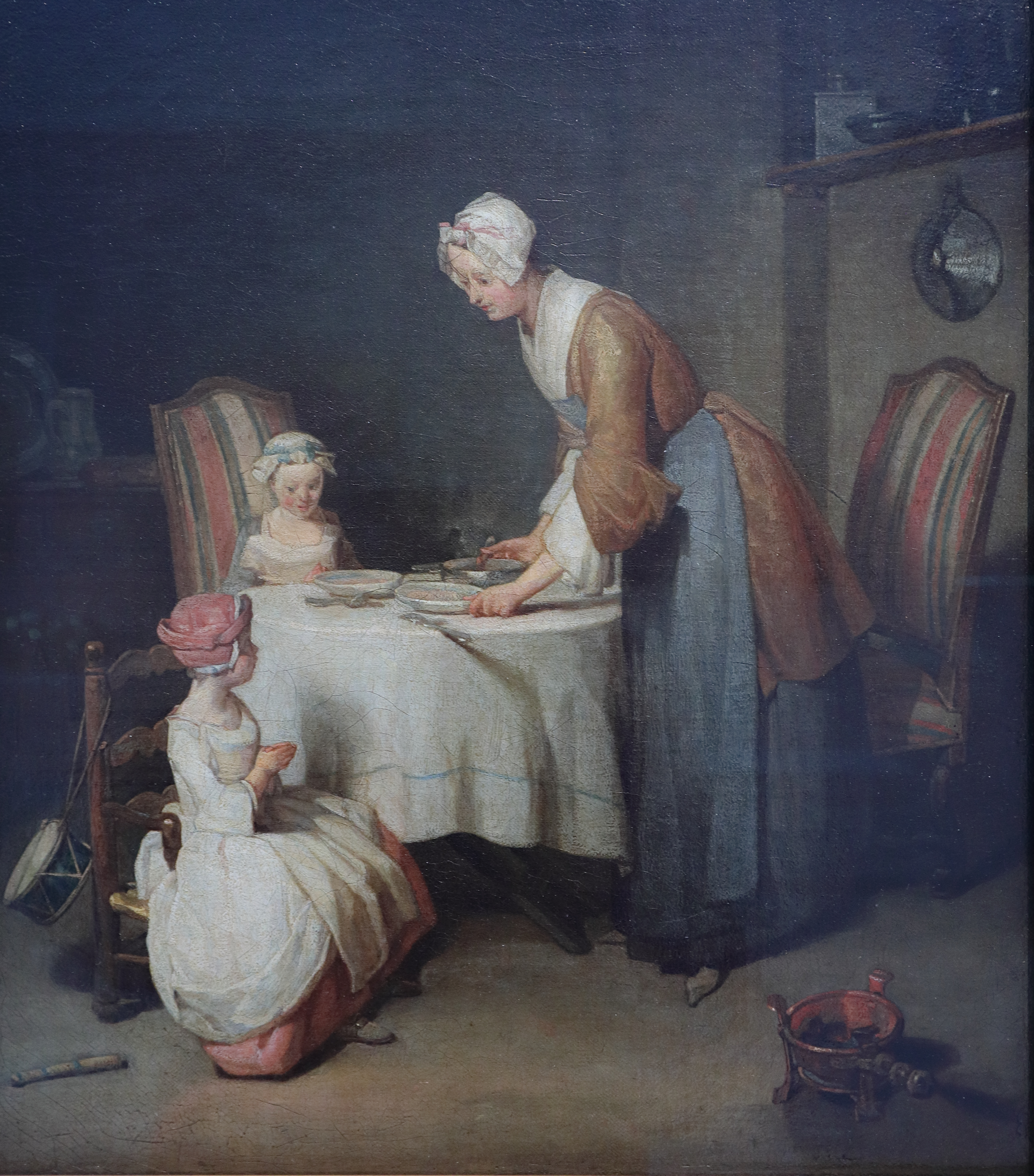
Saying Grace or The Prayer Before a Meal by Jean Simeon Chardin

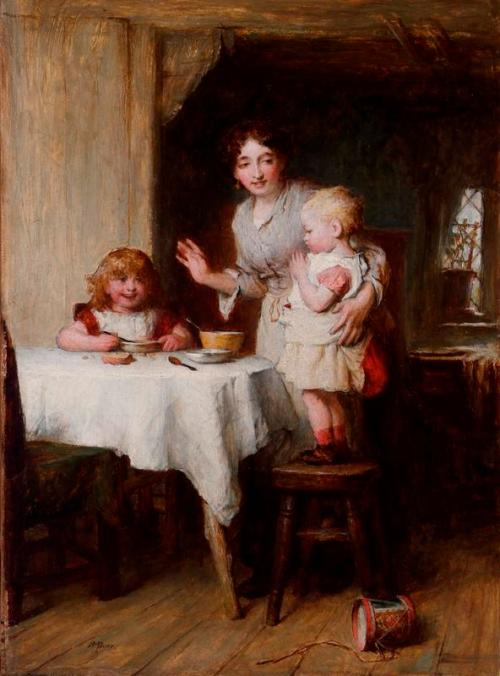
Saying Grace by Alexander Hohenlohe Burr

Typical Christian mealtime grace prayers include:

- Latin Catholic (before eating) – "Bless us, O Lord, and these Thy gifts, which we are about to receive from Thy bounty, through Christ our Lord. Amen." (Preceded and followed by the sign of the cross.)
- Latin Catholic (after eating) – "We give Thee thanks, Almighty God, for these and all Thy gifts, which we have received through Christ our Lord. Amen." (Preceded and followed by the sign of the cross.)
- Eastern Catholic, Eastern Lutheran, and Eastern Orthodox (before eating) – "O Christ God, bless the food and drink of Thy servants, for holy art Thou, always, now and ever, and unto the ages of ages. Amen." (The one saying the prayer may make the sign of the cross over the food with his right hand).
- Eastern Catholic, Eastern Lutheran, and Eastern Orthodox (after eating) – After the meal, all stand and sing: "We thank Thee, O Christ our God, that Thou hast satisfied us with Thine earthly gifts; deprive us not of Thy Heavenly Kingdom, but as Thou camest among Thy disciples, O Saviour, and gavest them peace, come unto us and save us." There are also seasonal hymns which are sung during the various great feasts. At Easter, it is customary to sing the Paschal troparion.
- Lutheran (Luther's blessing and thanks at meals, before eating) "The eyes of all wait upon Thee, O Lord, and Thou givest them their meat in due season; Thou openest Thine hand and satisfy the desires of every living thing. Lord God, Heavenly Father, bless us and these Thy gifts which we receive from Thy bountiful goodness, through Jesus Christ, our Lord. Amen." Or, alternatively, "The eyes of all look to you, O Lord, and you give them their food at the proper time. You open your hand and satisfy the desires of every living thing. Lord God, Heavenly Father, bless us and these Thy/Your gifts which we receive from Thy/Your bountiful goodness. Through Jesus Christ our Lord. Amen."
- Lutheran (more commonly, the common table prayer, before eating) "Come, Lord Jesus, be our Guest, and let Thy/these gifts to us be blessed. Amen."
- Lutheran (Luther's blessing and thanks at meals, after eating) "O give thanks unto the Lord, for He is good; for His mercy endures forever. (commonly ends here) He gives food to every creature; He provides food for the cattle and for the young ravens when they call. His pleasure is not in the strength of a horse, nor His delight in the legs of a man. The Lord delights in those who fear Him, who put their hope in His unfailing love. We thank You, Lord God Heavenly Father, for all your benefits, through Jesus Christ our Lord, who lives and reigns with you and the Holy Spirit, forever and ever. Amen."
- Anglican "Bless, O Father, Thy gifts to our use and us to Thy service; for Christ’s sake. Amen."
- Anglican, common in British, Australian and Commonwealth religious schools. "For what we are about to receive, may the Lord make us truly thankful/grateful. Amen."
- Methodist/Wesleyan (before eating) "Be present at our table Lord. Be here and everywhere adored. These mercies bless and grant that we may feast in fellowship with Thee. Amen."
- Methodist/Wesleyan (after eating) "We thank thee, Lord, for this our food, But more because of Jesus' blood. Let manna to our souls be given, The Bread of Life, sent down from heaven. Amen."
- Moravian "Be present at our table, Lord. Be here and everywhere adored. From Thine all bounteous hand, our food may we receive with gratitude. Amen" (may be sung to hymn tune "Wareham" or "Old Hundredth")
- Moravian "Come Lord Jesus, our Guest to be and bless these gifts bestowed by Thee. Amen"
- Scots (The Selkirk Grace) "Some hae meat and canna eat, And some wad eat that want it; But we hae meat, and we can eat, Sae let the Lord be thankit."
- YMCA (used at some summer camps) "Our Father, for this day, for our friends, for this food, we thank Thee. Amen."
- Presbyterian (before eating) "Gracious God, we have sinned against Thee, and are unworthy of Thy mercy; pardon our sins, and bless these mercies for our use, and help us to eat and drink to Thy glory, for Christ’s sake. Amen."
- Presbyterian (after eating) "Blessed God, in Thee we live, move and have our being; make us thankful for Thy mercies; and as we live by Thy providence, help us to live to Thy praise looking and waiting for a better life with Thyself above, through Jesus Christ our Lord. Amen."
- Latin "In Nomine Patris, et Filii, et Spiritus Sancti. Amen. Benedic, Domine, nos et haec Tua dona, quae de Tua largitate sumus sumpturi. Per Christum Dominum nostrum. Amen."
- Latin (before eating) – "Benedictus benedicat"
- Latin (after eating) – "Agimus Tibi gratias, omnipotens Deus, pro universis beneficiis Tuis. Qui vivis et regnas in saecula saeculorum. Amen."
- Latin (after eating) – "Benedicto benedicatur"

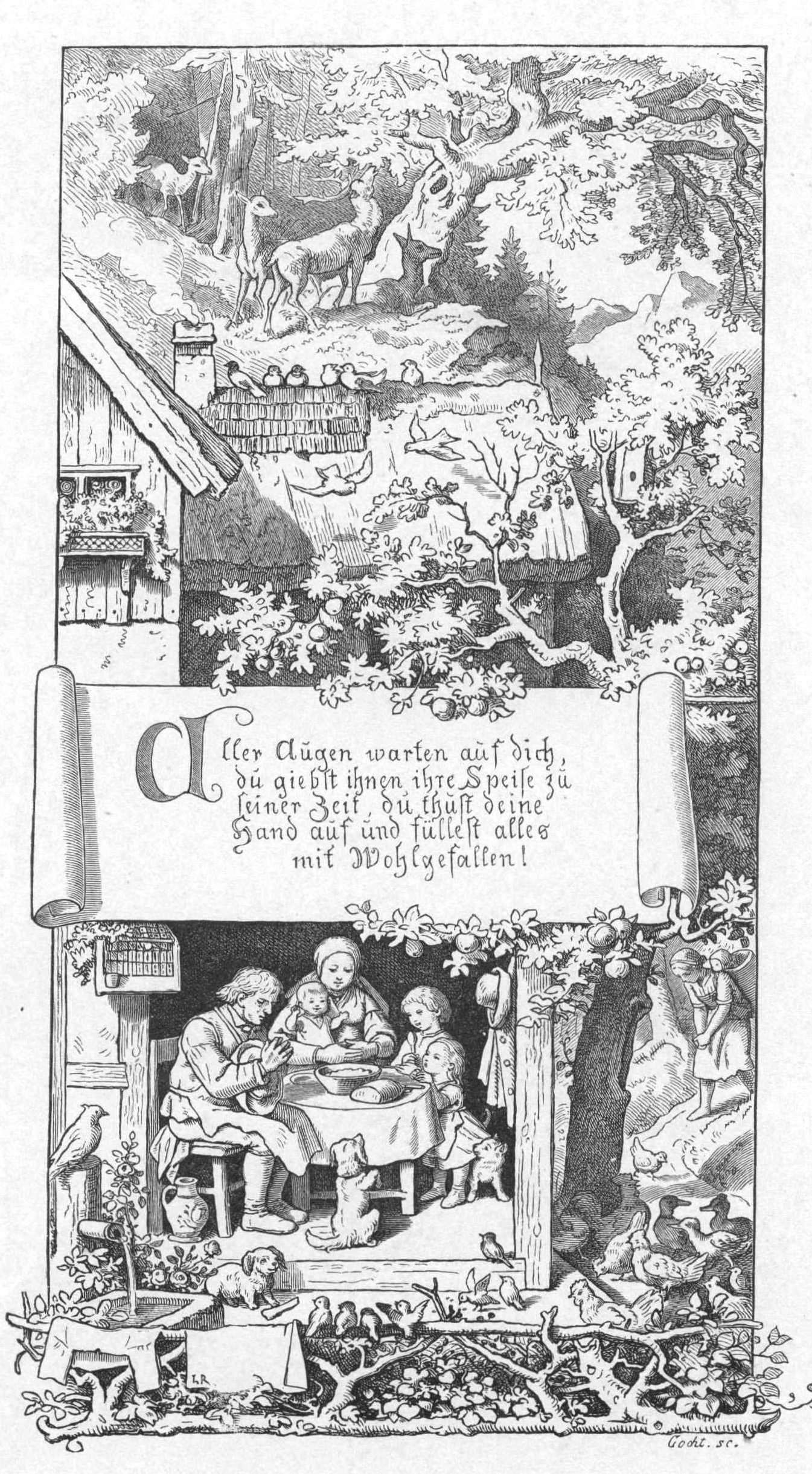
Aller Augen warten auf dich, illustration by Ludwig Richter.

German prayers to be sung before a meal include "Aller Augen warten auf dich" (All eyes are waiting for you) by Heinrich Schütz, after Psalm 145:15, and the anonymous 20th-century round "Segne, Vater, diese Gaben" (Bless Father, these gifts).

== Judaism ==
Before eating, a blessing is said based on the category of food that is being eaten. The categories are: (i) Bread, (ii) fruits that grow on a tree, (iii) fruits/vegetables that do not grow on a tree, (iv) derivates of the five grains (except for bread, which has its own blessing), (v) derivatives of grapes and (vi) everything else.

The Jewish mealtime prayer, after eating a meal that includes bread, is known as Birkat Hamazon. If the meal does not include bread, a blessing after the meal is recited based on the category of food that was eaten.

With the destruction of the Temple in Jerusalem in 70 AD, the offering of the prescribed sacrifices ceased in Judaism. Thereafter, the rabbis prescribed the substitution of other ritual actions to fill this void in Jewish obedience to the Torah. The ritual washing of hands and eating of salted bread is considered to be a substitute for the sacrificial offerings of the kohanim (Jewish priests).

Though there are separate blessings for fruit, vegetables, non-bread grain products, and meat, fish, and dairy products, a meal is not considered to be a meal in the formal sense unless bread is eaten. The duty of saying grace after the meal is derived from Deuteronomy 8:10: "And thou shalt eat and be satisfied and shalt bless the Lord thy God for the goodly land which he has given thee." Verse 8 of the same chapter says: "The land of wheat and barley, of the vine, the fig and the pomegranate, the land of the oil olive and of [date] syrup." Hence only bread made of wheat (which embraces spelt) or of barley (which for this purpose includes rye and oats) is deemed worthy of the blessing commanded in verse 10.

After the meal, a series of four (originally three) benedictions are said, or a single benediction if bread was not eaten.

== Islam ==
- Before eating:

- When a meal is ready: "Allahumma barik lana fima razaqtana waqina athaban-nar. " (Translation: O God! Bless the food You have provided us and save us from the punishment of the hellfire.)
- While starting to eat: bismillah ("In the name of God")

- On forgetting to say grace :
  Since each person says their grace individually, if someone forgets to say grace at the beginning, this supplication is made- "Bismillahi fee awalihi wa akhirihi." (In the name of God, in the beginning and the end.)
- After eating: "Alhamdulillah il-lathi at'amana wasaqana waja'alana Muslimeen. (Praise be to God Who has fed us and given us drink, and made us Muslims.) or simply "Alhamdulillah." (Praise be to God.)

== Baháʼí Faith ==
The Baháʼí Faith has these two prayers, which are meant for those who wish to thank God before they eat:

"He is God! Thou seest us, O my God, gathered around this table, praising Thy bounty, with our gaze set upon Thy Kingdom. O Lord! Send down upon us Thy heavenly food and confer upon us Thy blessing. Thou art verily the Bestower, the Merciful, the Compassionate."

"He is God! How can we render Thee thanks, O Lord? Thy bounties are endless and our gratitude cannot equal them. How can the finite utter praise of the Infinite? Unable are we to voice our thanks for Thy favors and in utter powerlessness we turn wholly to Thy Kingdom beseeching the increase of Thy bestowals and bounties. Thou art the Giver, the Bestower, the Almighty."

== Hinduism ==
Hindus use the 24th verse of the 4th chapter of Bhagavad Gita as a traditional prayer or blessing before a meal. Once the food is blessed it becomes prasada, or sanctified as holy:

brahmārpaṇaṁ brahma havir
brahmāgnau brahmaṇā hutam
brahmaiva tena gantavyaṁ
brahma karma samādhinā

Which translates as 'The act of offering is God (Brahma), the oblation is God, By God it is offered into the fire of God, God is That which is to be attained by him who sees God in all.'

Sometimes, the 14th verse from the 15th chapter of Bhagavad Gita is used:

ahaṁ vaiśvānaro bhūtvā
prāṇināṁ deham āśritaḥ
prāṇāpāna samā yuktaḥ
pacāmy annaṁ catur vidham

This translates as 'Becoming the life-fire in the bodies of living beings, mingling with the upward and downward breaths, I digest the four kinds of food.'

Traditional Marathi grace invokes Vishnu through a verse of Ramdas:

vadani kaval ghetā nāma ghye śriharice
sahaja havana hote nāma ghetā phukāce
jīvana karī jīvitvā anna he pūrṇabrahma
udarabharaṇa nohe jāṇije yadnyakarma

jānī bhojanī nāma vāce vaḍave
ati ādare gadya ghoṣe mhaṇave
haricintane anna sevita jāve
tarī śrihari pāvijeto svabhāve

This translates as: Eating with remembrance of God turns food into a sacred offering, making the act of eating itself a form of worship that pleases Vishnu.

== Buddhism ==
In Buddhism, different traditions have prayers that are said or chanted before meals.

In Japanese Zen, a prayer on the "Five Reflections", Gokan-no-ge, are done before and after meals. This includes putting one's hands together and say "Itadakimasu" (頂きます，いただきます) ("I humbly receive") before eating a meal. Upon finishing a meal, the polite phrase gochisōsama-deshita (ご馳走様でした，ごちそうさまでした; lit. "that was (the condition of) an (honorable) feast"). In response, the preparer often says osomatsusama-deshita (お粗末様でした，おそまつさまでした; lit. "I think that meal was not feast").

Theravadan monks chant a reminder not to crave food.

In the Nichiren School of Buddhism, a prayer is done to "repay the Four Favors", debts we owe to parents, sentient beings, leaders and The Buddha, Dharma and Sanga.

== Oomoto ==
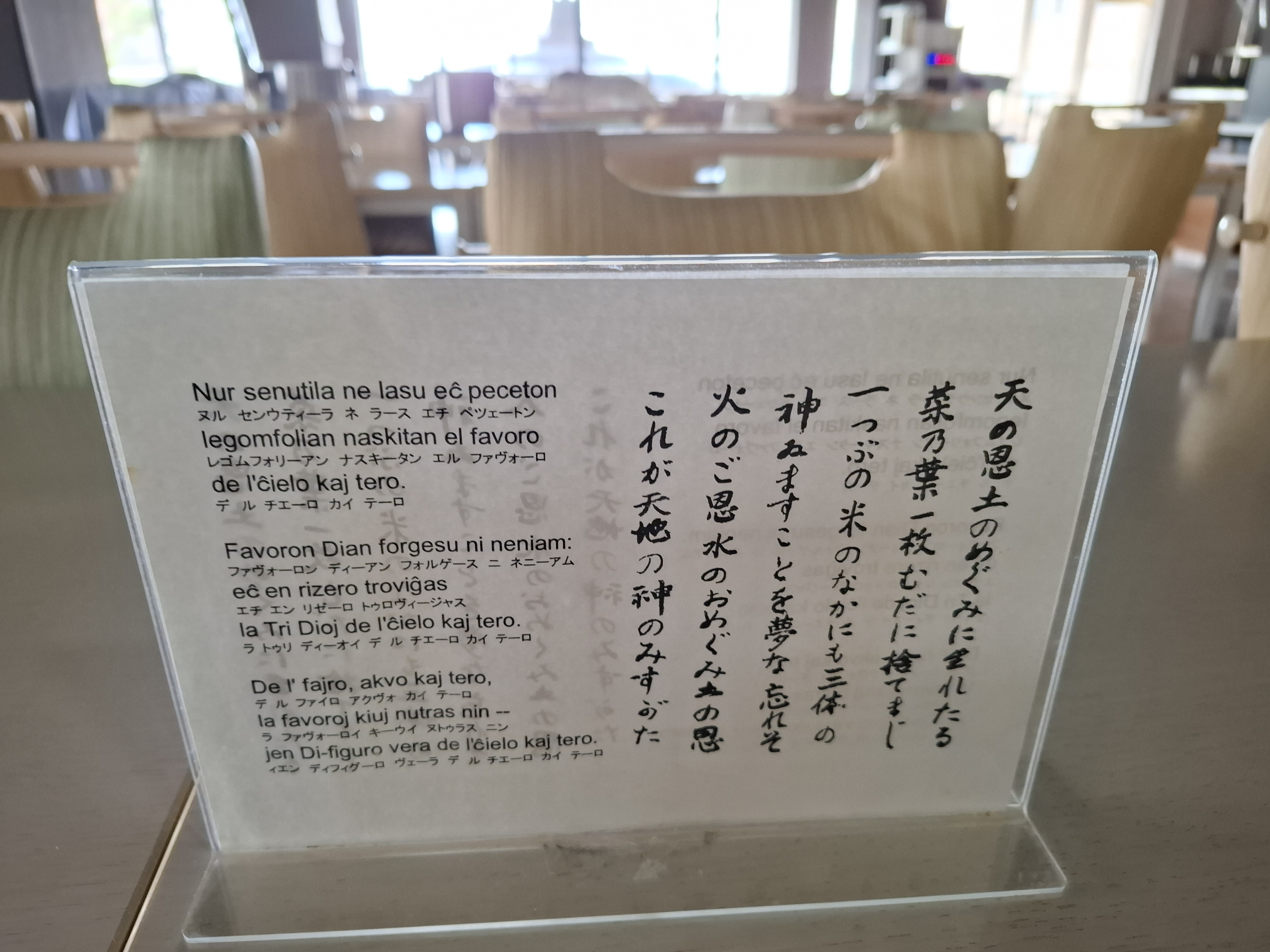
A bilingual Esperanto-Japanese prayer in appreciation of food at the Oomoto headquarters' cafeteria in Kameoka, Kyoto

In the Japanese new religion Oomoto, a prayer is recited before meals, after which "itadakimasu" is said. The prayer consists of three tanka poems (known in Japanese as the "Three-Poem Song" 三首のお歌) composed by Oomoto's second spiritual leader, Sumiko Deguchi (1883–1952). In 1976, Oomoto's third spiritual leader Naohi Deguchi adopted the prayer for use before meals.

== Māori religion ==
In the traditional faith of the Māori people of New Zealand, a special prayer (karakia) is incantated in reception of food made or gathered:

Nau mai e ngā hua o te wao, o te wai tai, o te wai māori.
Nā Tane, nā Rongo, nā Tangaroa, nā Maru.
Ko Ranginui e tū iho nei, ko Papatūānuku e takoto ake nei.
Tūturu whakamaua kia tina,
Haumi ē, hui ē, taiki ē!

Come, o produce of the forests, the seas, [and] the fresh waters.
[You are the gifts] of Tāne, Rongo, Tangaroa and Maru.
Ranginui stands above me, Papatūānuku lies beneath me.
Fixed be our commitment [to provide for the table]
[Let us] gather [to eat] !

== Other pre-meal traditions ==
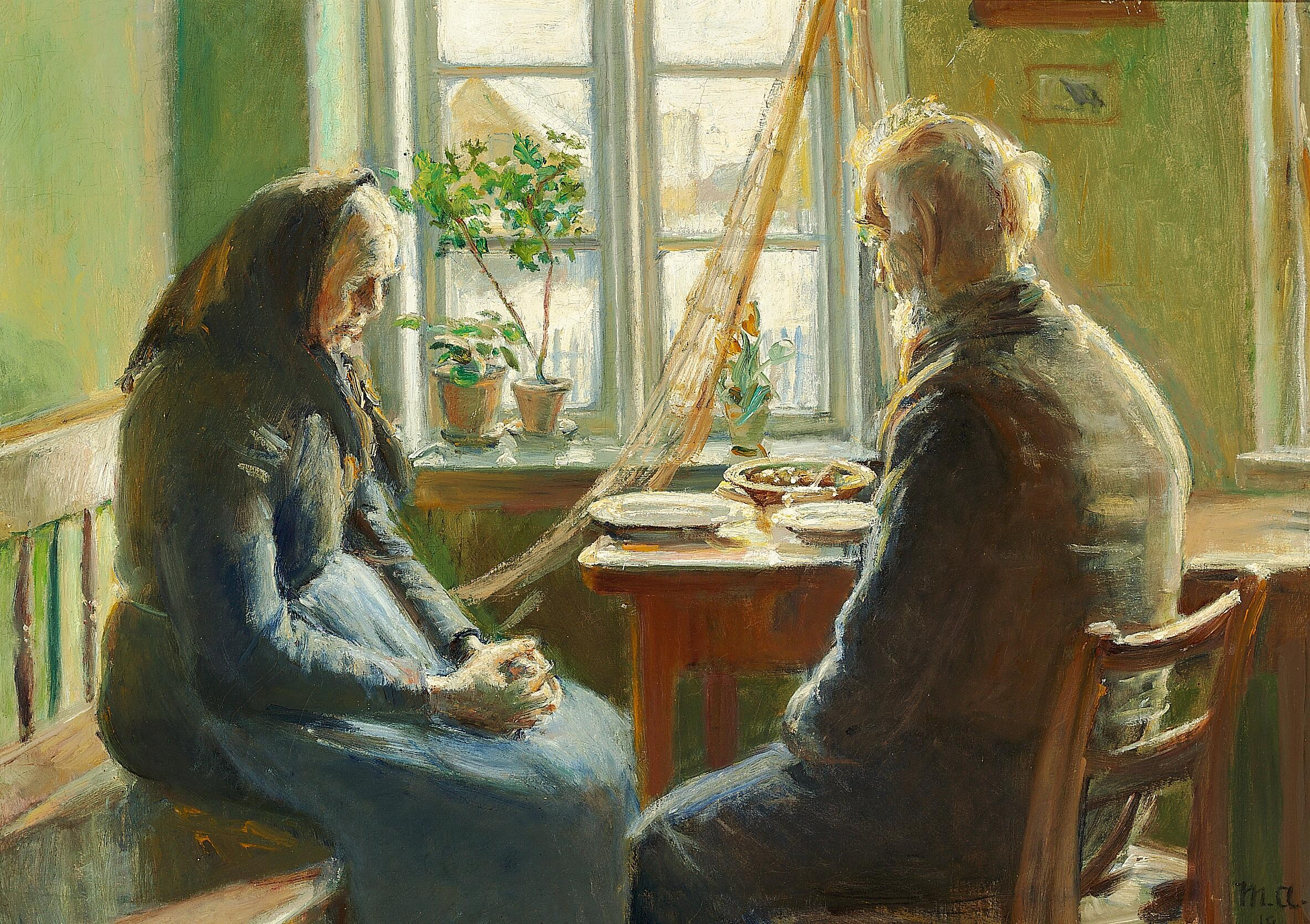
The grace by Michael Ancher, 1919

In certain Boy Scout circles, especially in Missouri, the "S-F" grace (named after the S-F Scout Ranch in Knob Lick, Missouri) is often said, especially when people at the table are of mixed religions. The S-F grace gives thanks to a "great Spirit", but is not affiliated with any one religion.

Another common Boy Scout grace is the "Philmont Grace" (named after the Philmont Scout Ranch in New Mexico) or the "Wilderness Grace". It can be found in use wherever a troop has gone to Philmont, but is most common in the Western half of the United States. It goes: " For food, for raiment, / For life, for opportunities, / For friendship and fellowship, / We thank thee, O Lord."

== See also ==
- Common table prayer
- Direction of prayer
- Fixed prayer times
- Wilderness Grace
- Christian child's prayer § Giving thanks
