= Mannenji Temple =

Jodo sect temple in Iwamizawa, Japan

Religion
- Affiliation: Buddhist

Location
- Location: 75 Manjiyuki Town, Kurisawa Town, Iwamizawa City, Hokkaido
- Interactive map of Mannenji Temple

Mannenji Temple is a temple dedicated to the Jodo sect of Buddhism. It is located in the town of Iwamizawa, Japan. It is known to house the haunted doll Okiku. There are many versions of how the doll arrived at the temple, but all involve a girl dying and her family leaving the doll there.

== Etymology ==
The name Mannenji comes from 万年寺 (Ten Thousand Years).
