= The Legend of Robert the Doll =

2018 horror film directed by Andrew Jones

- Official release poster
- Directed by: Andrew Jones
- Written by: Andrew Jones
- Produced by: Lee Bane; Andrew Jones; Rebecca Graham
- Starring: Lee Bane; Harriet Rees; Judith Haley; Eloise Juryeff; Gareth Lawrence
- Cinematography: Jonathan McLaughlin
- Edited by: Andrew Jones
- Music by: Bobby Cole
- Production company: North Bank Entertainment
- Distributed by: 4Digital Media; Take One; Great Movies; Frighten Entertainment; Netflix; White Pearl Movies; Encripta
- Release dates: March 6, 2018 (United States); March 19, 2018 (United Kingdom)
- Running time: 80 minutes
- Country: United Kingdom
- Language: English

The Legend of Robert the Doll (also known as The Revenge of Robert the Doll) is a 2018 British supernatural horror film written and directed by Andrew Jones. The film is a direct sequel to The Toymaker (2017), taking place before the events of Robert, and is the fourth installment in the Robert the Doll film series. It stars Lee Bane, Harriet Rees, Judith Haley, Eloise Juryeff and Gareth Lawrence.

== Plot ==
In 1939, SS Officer Dietrich arrives at the home of Joseph Von Hammersmark to negotiate the price of Von Hammersmark's latest book, in which he wrote mystical recitations and spells from practices observed in Tibet and Egypt. After Von Hammersmark proves the power of the book's spells, Dietrich agrees to pay a large sum of money. As the officer leaves, Joseph catches his wife Eva eavesdropping and assaults her.

That night, Eva breaks into the box where the book is kept and sneaks away with it. While driving away, she picks up a hitchhiker, Frederick Voller, who holds her at gunpoint and tells her to take him to Kulmbach. After the car gets a flat tire, they stop at a nearby house where they are welcomed by a man named Helmut. Feeling threatened, Frederick becomes aggressive, but he is shot by Eva and Helmut buries his remains in the garden. It is revealed that Helmut is actually Colonel Von Braun. He recovers the book and calls Dietrich, who returns to the Hammersmark residence and executes Joseph.

In 1941, Col. Von Braun tells the story of The Muller Family's execution, the book ending up in Amos Blackwood's possession, the animation of the dolls, and the deaths of Von Avenslaven and his men. (Note: As depicted in The Toymaker.) He has intelligence that the toymaker is boarding a train and the orders are to board the train at Munich, retrieve the book, and kill the toymaker. Meanwhile, another agency has the same intel, but their directive is to save the toymaker before the train reaches Nuremberg, where the Nazis will be waiting to take the book into possession.

Blackwood boards the train, unaware that he is being followed. It is revealed that he was once married to a woman named Mary and had a family, a son named Hans and a daughter named Agnes. Mary had an affair with an unmarried man and told him she wanted to leave her husband for him, but he rejected her due to not wanting to raise Mary's children. Furious, Mary went home and drowned her children. She returned to her lover, but he rejected her again.

Fuchs, one of the men looking for Blackwood, goes on a murderous rampage throughout the train and finds Amos just as the Nazis find him. Blackwood's toys—which he refers to as his "children"—come to life and fight Fuchs, several of them dying while protecting Amos. As the train stops in Nuremberg and the Nazis board the train for the book, Blackwood awaits with his dolls.

In 2012, in the United Kingdom, Agatha approaches Blackwood to complain that her employers are mistreating her, asking to use the book to hurt them. He refuses, so Agatha leaves and takes Robert with her. (Note: This leads directly into the events of Robert.)

== Cast ==
- Lee Bane as The Toymaker
- Harriet Rees as Esther Muller
- Judith Haley as Agatha
- Eloise Juryeff as Eva Von Hammersmark (as Eloise Oliver)
- Gareth Lawrence as Frederick Voller
- David Imper as Joseph Von Hammersmark
- Nicholas Anscombe as Colonel Heinrich Von Braun
- Derek Nelson as Fuchs
- Darren Swain as Schulz
- Lee Mark Jones as SS Officer Dietrich
- Severin Ritter as SS Officer Hauser (as Wes Ritter)
- Josephine Partridge as Mary Blackwood
- Jevan White as Hans Blackwood
- Olivia Lee as Agnes Blackwood
- Morgan Thomas as Jonas Rothschild
- David Lyndon as Landon Fox
- Natalie Louise Garcia as Ingrid
- Robert Graham as Wilhelm
- Courtney Bartle as Francesca
- Nathan Head as Officer Heinrich Berger (archive footage)
- Bodo Friesecke as Officer Karl Gebhardt (archive footage)
- Erick Hayden as Colonel Ludolf Von Alvensleben (archive footage)

== Production ==
Cast and crew started filming on August 8, 2017 and wrapped on August 20, 2017.

=== Filming locations ===
- The film was shot at Coed Adam Farmhouse in Llangyndeyrn, Kidwelly, Wales.
- Gwili railway station, Bronwydd Arms Station, Carmarthen, Wales.
- Parc Le Breos House, Parkmill, Gower, Swansea, Wales.
- Times Square, New York.

== Release ==
The film was released in VOD at the United States on March 6, 2018 and at the United Kingdom on March 19, 2018. It was also released in Netflix at Sweden, Netherlands and Poland on April 5, 2022.

== Reception ==
Culture Crypt gave the film a review score of 15 out of 100 and wrote;

If you've seen one of these Robert movies before, you already know what we're working with, which is a lazy script, a lazy handheld camera, and a lazy excuse for a killer doll movie that barely includes 90 seconds of the killer doll.

ML Miller of Mlmillerwrites.com gave the film a mixed review and wrote;

The thing is, this is not a badly made film. It's capably acted. The scenes are compelling and the actors do a decent job of selling the story. The problem is that the title states this is a ROBERT THE DOLL movie and it simply isn't.

== Prequel ==
Robert Reborn was released on 24 June 2019.
