= Werewolves of the Third Reich =

2017 British horror film

- Directed by: Andrew Jones
- Written by: Andrew Jones
- Starring: Annabelle Lanyon; Lee Bane; Derek Nelson; Kwame Augustine; Neville Cann
- Release date: 2017
- Country: United Kingdom
- Language: English

Werewolves of the Third Reich is a 2017 British horror film written and directed by Andrew Jones.

== Premise ==
A group of American soldiers stumble upon sinister experiments conducted by an evil Nazi doctor to create an army of werewolf warriors.

== Cast ==
- Annabelle Lanyon as Helga Hammerstein
- David France as Dr. Hammerstein
- Angharad Berrow as Erica Hammerstein
- Dennis Farrin as Sergeant Peck
- Lee Bane as 'Mad Dog' Murphy
- Derek Nelson as Billy 'The Butcher'
- Kwame Augustine as Reggie 'Reckless' Brown
- Darren Swain as Joe 'Fighting Joe' Kane
- Rik Grayson as Wilder
- Joseph Simpson-Bushell as Hyde
- Suzie Frances Garton as Ilsa Koch
- Jared Morgan as The Bartender
- Patrick O'Donnell as SS Officer Schneider
- Tim Larkfield as SS Officer Streicher
- Francesco Tribuzio as SS Officer Becker
- Gareth Lawrence as SS Officer Hess
- Lee Mark Jones as SS Officer Schreck
- Neville Cann as Dr. Josef Mengele
- Oliver Fritz as Adolf Hitler
