= Anna Ecklund =

American woman with alleged demonic possession

- Born: Emma Schmidt
- Other name: Anna Ecklund
- Known for: Alleged demonic possession

Anna Ecklund was a pseudonym for Emma Schmidt, an American woman whose alleged demonic possession and exorcism occurred over several decades, culminating in an extensive exorcism that lasted from August 18 to December 23, 1928, in Earling, Iowa. Ecklund was said to have exhibited symptoms akin to possession beginning at age fourteen, and was forty-six years old during her final exorcism by Father Theophilus Riesinger, a Roman Catholic priest.

Ecklund's case is considered by theologians and scholars of the paranormal to be one of the most abundantly documented cases of possession in the 20th century, including a profile in a 1936 issue of Time magazine.

== Early life ==
Various published sources state that Emma Schmidt was born in Milwaukee on March 23, 1882 and raised in a Catholic household in Marathon, Wisconsin. This biography is problematic because it makes Emma the daughter of Eduard Schmidt, contradicting both published and unpublished accounts of Emma's purported possession and exorcisms which state that her father's name was Jacob. If this information is correct, the true identity of Emma Schmidt, as per records found on Ancestry.com, may be Hulda Emma Schmidt, born July 3, 1882, in Thurgau, Switzerland to Jacob and Anna Schmidt, who subsequently emigrated to Wisconsin in 1884. This Emma Schmidt was one of nine children, and died June 23, 1964, in Milwaukee, Wisconsin.

According to Wisconsin birth records, both of Schmidt's parents were German immigrants. Some sources contradict the narrative that she was raised in Marathon, Wisconsin. The unpublished Bunse manuscript states Riesinger exorcized Schmidt in Milwaukee, Wisconsin, and that Emma Schmidt - known as "Mary X" - met Riesinger in New York when Emma Schmidt was 16, around 1898. An article in the Des Moines Register from 23 September 1928 stated, "Relatives living near here are thought to have prevailed upon the Reverend Joseph Steiger, pastor of St. Joseph’s church, to bring the woman to Earling from an eastern city for the ritual," which suggests Emma Schmidt was from the US East Coast and not Wisconsin. She reportedly began exhibiting signs of possession during her adolescence, demonstrating revulsion of holy objects, "disturbed" thoughts, and an inability to enter churches. Ecklund also began to take part in "unspeakable sexual acts." According to an account published in 1935, the believed source of Ecklund's possession was her aunt Mina, a reputed local witch who placed spells on herbs for food she prepared. Mina was purportedly also a lover of Ecklund's father.

== Exorcisms and death ==
On June 18, 1912, Ecklund underwent an exorcism by Father Theophilus Riesinger, a Capuchin priest originally from Bavaria, Germany, entrusted by Bishop Thomas Drumm of Des Moines, Iowa. Riesinger had been a monk at the community of St. Anthony's in Marathon, Wisconsin. Little was documented concerning this initial exorcism; however, Ecklund was not consulted for over two decades after the 1912 exorcism.

In the summer of 1928, Riesinger was again consulted to perform a second exorcism on Ecklund. Father Joseph Stieger of Earling, Iowa, a friend of Riesinger, suggested the exorcism be undertaken at a convent owned by the Franciscan Sisters in Earling. Ecklund was taken to the convent on August 17, 1928, and reportedly exhibited numerous symptoms, including falling into fits of rage over food that had been sprinkled with holy water, and hissing like a cat. With the help of the Franciscan sisters of the convent, the exorcism began on August 18. The exorcism was reportedly violent, with Ecklund levitating, howling, and hanging from the frame of the doorway. The first session lasted until August 26; a second session occurred between September 13 and September 20, followed by a final eight-day session that lasted from December 15 to December 23, 1928.

The extensive exorcism resulted in deterioration of Ecklund's body, as she refused to consume food, also vomiting foul debris and what appeared to be tobacco leaves. Her head, lips, and face reportedly swelled, and she also was able to speak in multiple languages unknown to her. The exorcism was reportedly so grueling, and Ecklund's behavior so violent, that several nuns in the Franciscan order asked to be relocated to a different convent. Ecklund was believed to be possessed by Judas Iscariot, as well as Jacob, her own father, who had cursed her with the help of his lover, her aunt Mina, for refusing his incestuous sexual advances during her adolescence. During the exorcisms, Ecklund also spoke in a high falsetto voice, which Riesinger interpreted as the voice of her aunt Mina.

On December 23, the final day of the exorcism, Father Riesinger commanded the demons in the name of the Father, the Son, and the Holy Spirit, through the intercession of the Blessed Virgin Mary to depart to Hell. Ecklund collapsed on her bed and began to shriek "Beelzebub, Judas, Jacob, Mina," followed by "Hell! Hell! Hell!" She opened her eyes, and then spoke in her own voice, saying "My Jesus, Mercy! Praised be Jesus Christ!" Riesinger's exorcism was reportedly successful, and Ecklund only exhibited "milder" and "quite manageable" possessions after it. Her true identity was kept protected from the public in written accounts.

Anna Ecklund (Emma Schmidt) died on July 23, 1941, at age 59 (?), or, if Hulda Emma Schmidt, on June 23, 1964, at age 81.

== In culture ==
In 2016, a fictionalized British-produced film entitled The Exorcism of Anna Ecklund was released, documenting her possession and exorcism.

In 2025, The Ritual was released, documenting Ecklund's possession and exorcism.

In October 2026, the podcast The Exorcist Files released two one hour episodes in Season 3 Case #22, discussing her story, possession and exorcism.

=== Published accounts ===
Carl Vogl, a theologian, wrote an account of the possession in German, titled Begone, Satan in 1935, using the pseudonym Anna Ecklund. According to Francis Young, an Anglican historian, elements of the account published by Vogl were repeated in a written account of Robbie Mannheim in Mount Rainier, Maryland in 1949 by Jesuit priests. Young views the publication of the Ecklund case as integral in exemplifying the "American exorcism."

In February 1936, the 1928 exorcism was profiled in Time magazine.

== See also ==
- Exorcism of Roland Doe

== Works cited ==
- Anderson, Robert (2006). Psychics, Sensitives and Somnambules: A Biographical Dictionary with Bibliographies. McFarland. ISBN 978-0-786-42770-3.
- Cruz, Joan Carroll (1999). Angels and Devils. TAN Books. ISBN 978-0-895-55638-7.
- Ebon, Martin (1974). The Devil's Bride: Exorcism: Past and Present. Harper & Row. ISBN 978-0-060-62114-8.
- Guiley, Rosemary (2009). The Encyclopedia of Demons and Demonology. Infobase Publishing. ISBN 978-1-438-13191-7.
- Palmer, Terence (2014). The Science of Spirit Possession. Cambridge Scholars Publishing. ISBN 978-1-443-86810-5.
- Schouweiler, Thomas (1992). The Devil: Opposing Viewpoints. Greenhaven Press. ISBN 978-0-89908091-8. "The Devil: Opposing Viewpoints."
- Vogl, Carl (1994) [1935]. Begone, Satan. Translated by Rev. Celestine Kapsner, O.S.B. TAN Books. ISBN 978-0-895-55098-9.
- Wilson, Colin (1987). Afterlife: An Investigation. Doubleday. ISBN 978-0-385-23766-6.
- Young, Francis (2016). A History of Exorcism in Catholic Christianity. Palgrave Macmillan. ISBN 978-3-319-29112-3.
