= Kassner =

Kassner is a surname. Notable people with the surname include:

- Edward Kassner (1920–1996), music executive
- Eli Kassner (1924–2018), guitar teacher and musician
- Helmut Kassner (born 1946), motorcycle road racer
- Helmut Kassner (military officer) (1897–1960)
- Horst Kassner, motorcycle road racer
- Kerstin Kassner (born 1958), German politician
- Rudolf Kassner (1873–1959), writer

== See also ==
- Kasner
