= Kasner =

Kasner is a surname. Notable people with the surname include:

- Angela Merkel, née Kasner (born 1954), German Chancellor
- Edward Kasner (1878–1955), American mathematician, Tutor on Mathematics in the Columbia University Mathematics Department
- Marliese Kasner (born Marliese Miller) (born 1982), Canadian curler from Canwood, Saskatchewan

== See also ==
- Kasner metric, an exact solution to Einstein's theory of general relativity
- Kasner polygon of a polygon P is the polygon whose vertices are the midpoints of the edges of P
- Kasner's dwarf burrowing skink (Scelotes kasneri) is a species of skink in the family Scincidae
- Kassner
