= The Curse of Robert the Doll =

2016 horror film directed by Andrew Jones

- DVD cover
- Directed by: Andrew Jones
- Written by: Andrew Jones
- Produced by: Lee Bane; Andrew Jones
- Starring: Jason Homewood; Nigel Barber; Chris Bell; Lee Bane
- Cinematography: Jonathan McLaughlin
- Edited by: Andrew Jones
- Music by: Bobby Cole
- Production company: North Bank Entertainment
- Distributed by: 4Digital Media; Take One; Great Movies; Frighten Entertainment; Eurofilms; Campaolo Films; Encripta
- Release date: 12 September 2016 (United Kingdom)
- Running time: 79 minutes
- Country: United Kingdom
- Language: English
- Box office: $19,096

The Curse of Robert the Doll (also known as The Curse of Robert) is a 2016 British supernatural B-horror film written and directed by Andrew Jones. A sequel to the 2015 film Robert and the second installment in the Robert the Doll film series. It stars Jason Homewood, Nigel Barber, Chris Bell and Lee Bane.

== Plot ==
Emily Barker starts her new job as a night cleaner at the East Falls Museum, where the infamous haunted Robert the Doll is newly on display. She meets security guards Kevin and Stan and the head cleaner Ethel. Almost immediately, she experiences eerie occurrences, whispers in empty rooms and mysterious handprints, signs that Robert’s evil presence is still alive. Kevin and Emily grow closer and talk about their dreams. Kevin dreams of being a photographer whereas Emily went back to university in an effort to figure out her life's plan.

As Emily works through the nights, Robert's curse manifests violently. One night, Stan hears strange noises and goes to investigate, only to be suffocated with a plastic bag by Robert. A police officer named Sardy investigates and does not believe Emily's story that Robert is haunted. Emily and Kevin begin a romantic relationship.

Emily asks Ethel to clean Robert's section instead, in fear. Ethel is brutally attacked by Robert with a screwdriver. Officer Sardy returns once again and identifies Kevin and Emily as the prime suspects in the two mysterious deaths. Nothing is caught on camera. The deaths are brutal and unexplained, but Emily begins to connect the murders to Robert.

Emily researches Robert's past and finds him connected to two mysterious deaths in the Otto residence, in which Jenny Otto's young son is blamed and arrested. Jenny Otto has been committed to an institution. When they visit her, she warns them the doll is possessed by a vengeful spirit that punishes anyone who disrespects it. Jenny tells them that the doll's evil energy was stirred up by a man named Amos Blackwood, perhaps for monetary profit. Kevin and Emily guess the owner of the museum Walter Berenson is to blame and that he is actually Amos.

Kevin calls Walter to confront him. He states he knows Walter tampered with the CCTV and bluffs that he has the video proof that Robert killed the two staff members. Kevin surprisingly asks for $100,000 in exchange for the video footage. At the threat of financial ruin, Walter agrees.

Kevin and Emily go to the police with their story but are not believed. They tell Officer Sardy about the meeting and promise to return with proof that Robert is to blame. At the meeting, they exchange the phone for an envelope with Walter. When Kevin opens the envelope, he finds nothing but paper. Walter laughs and tells him that is how much he is worth. He gets out a gun and shoots Kevin in the leg before Robert comes up behind Walter and brutally slays him. Kevin and Emily attempt to escape but the power goes out, leaving them in darkness. Robert then slits Kevin's throat and a horrified Emily runs. When Robert is stalking the corridors, Emily comes up behind him and decapitates him before falling unconscious.

Emily wakes up in the hospital, finding Officer Sardy by her bedside. He asks her to recount what happened in the museum. She asks if he found the doll to which he denies. She is then arrested for the murders.

Later, it is revealed that Officer Sardy is working with Amos Blackwood and accepted money in exchange for silence about the doll. In Amos' doll workshop, he brings out a suitcase and opens it, revealing Robert who survived. Amos fixes Robert and affectionately puts him on the shelf. Robert turns to look at the countless dolls in the workshop. Many of them move their heads and look at the camera too.

== Cast ==
- Jason Homewood as Kevin Underwood
- Nigel Barber as Walter Berenson
- Chris Bell as Officer Sardy
- Lee Bane as The Toymaker
- Suzie Frances Garton as Jenny Otto
- Tiffany Ceri as Emily Barker
- Steven Dolton as Detective Bill Atkins
- Christopher Hale as Stan Graves
- Richard Burman as Police Officer
- Clare Gollop as Ethel Mason

== Release ==
The film was released in United Kingdom on 12 September 2016 and was released in VOD, DVD and Blu-ray on 30 June 2017.

== Reception ==
Culture Crypt gave the film a review score of 25 over 100 and wrote; "The title attraction's collective screen time possibly exceeds one minute, but doubtful it runs over two. When he does appear, Robert's "animation" consists of having offscreen hands shake him ridiculously or clunkily moving a limb. No attempt is made to give the doll character outside of his goofily silent expression."

Tom from Letterboxd gave the film a half star and said: "I was about to give this a whole 1 star, however the police officer reads the American Miranda rights rather than the British 'right to silence' speech. This was so egregious that I had to demote this film to half a star."

Ml Miller Writes gave the film a mixed to positive reviews and said: "The Robert in this film takes more of a hands-on approach to his kills. The low-fi way the doll is simply moved by someone off screen can be viewed as hokey or charming depending on your tolerance for low budget cinema."

Gemma Johnson of Spooky Isles gave the film a negative review and she wrote: "I like to try to find something positive within each film that I watch but I couldn't find anything here, and I tried really, really hard. The most positive thing is that I have watched this film, so you don't have to."

== Sequel ==
The Toymaker was released on 21 August 2017,The Revenge of Robert the Doll on 6 March 2018, and Robert Reborn on 24 June 2019.
