= Common table prayer =

Mealtime prayer

The common table prayer is probably the best known mealtime prayer among North American Lutherans. Several other variations also exist.

== History ==
The earliest known publication of the common table prayer was in German, in the schoolbook Neues und nützliches SchulBuch für die Jugend biß ins zehente oder zwölffte Jahr (New and useful schoolbook for youth up to the tenth or twelfth year), written by Johann Conrad Quensen and published in Hannover and Wolfenbüttel in 1698. The prayer was likely inspired by similar wording in a 1669 aria by Johann Rudolph Ahle. The prayer then spread through Germany and beyond, notably in Nicolaus Zinzendorf's 1753 hymnal Etwas vom Liede Mosis, which for many years was thought to be the prayer's earliest publication.

== Text ==
Original German:

Komm, Herr Jesu; sei unser Gast;
und segne, was du uns bescheret hast.

English:

Come, Lord Jesus, be our Guest;
And bless what you have bestowed.

or alternatively, a Moravian translation,

Come, Lord, Jesus, our Guest to be
And bless these gifts bestowed by Thee.

There are several variations common today for the second line. In English there are other second lines such as "Let these gifts to us be blessed," "Let Thy gifts to us be blessed," "Let these Thy gifts to us be blessed," "Let these foods to us be blessed," "And let this food by Thee be blessed, "let these gifts to us be blessed and may our souls by thee be fed ever on the living bread," and "and bless what you have bestowed to us out of mercy", and "Bless us and everything Thou hast set before us." Also in German there are several other versions such as "und segne, was du uns bescheret hast," and "und segne, was du uns aus Gnaden bescheret hast". A second "verse" may also be added: "Blessed be God who is our bread; may all the world be clothed and fed." Moravians often add "Bless our loved ones everywhere and keep them in Thy loving care."

Sometimes the verse of Psalm 136:1 is added at the end. "O give thanks unto/to the Lord, for He is good: For His mercy/love endureth/endures forever." This part of the prayer is prayed either right after the first part of the prayer before a meal or separately from the first part of the prayer at the end of a meal.

A common North American variation of this prayer generally goes as follows: "Come Lord Jesus be our guest and let these gifts to us be blessed."

== See also ==
- Christian child's prayer
- Lutheranism
