= Robert Reborn =

2019 horror film by Andrew Jones

- Official release poster
- Directed by: Andrew Jones
- Written by: Andrew Jones
- Produced by: Harry Willis; Andrew Jones; Rebecca Graham; Tom Willis
- Starring: David Lenik; Lee Bane; John R. Walker; Brendan Purcell; Peter Svatik; Lux Kapsaski
- Cinematography: Jonathan McLaughlin
- Edited by: Andrew Jones
- Production company: North Bank Entertainment
- Distributed by: 4Digital Media; Netflix
- Release date: June 24, 2019 (United Kingdom)
- Running time: 85 minutes
- Country: United Kingdom
- Language: English

Robert Reborn is a 2019 British B-horror film written and directed by Andrew Jones. It is a direct sequel to the 2018 film The Legend of Robert the Doll and a prequel to the 2015 film Robert; it is the fifth and final installment in the Robert the Doll film series.

Robert Reborn was the final film of director Andrew Jones, who died on January 15, 2023.

== Plot ==
In 1951, during the height of the Cold War, Soviet leader Joseph Stalin is gravely ill. Desperate to find a way to save him, the KGB sends Agent Stoichkov on a mission. He discovers a strange stage performance in the Baltic region where a mysterious German toymaker showcases lifelike puppets—Robert, Kalashnikov, and Miss Cyclops—that move and perform with eerie realism.

Stoichkov learns the toymaker possesses an ancient book of dark magic rumored to grant eternal life. Believing this power could be the key to saving Stalin, Stoichkov abducts the toymaker and plans to fly him to Moscow so his secrets can be exploited.

However, the toymaker’s living dolls are fiercely loyal. Unwilling to let their master be taken, the dolls secretly board the same plane, hidden in luggage. Mid-flight, they come to life and begin slaughtering the plane’s crew and passengers one by one in a violent bid to rescue their creator.

Trapped in the sky with nowhere to run, Stoichkov and his team must face the supernatural terror they unknowingly unleashed. As the body count rises and the plane spirals into chaos, it becomes a fight for survival not just from the dolls, but from the consequences of tampering with powers beyond human understanding.

In the end, the dolls prove unstoppable, and their master is reclaimed. The mission fails, leaving behind a trail of destruction at 30,000 feet.

== Cast ==
- David Lenik as Adler
- Lee Bane as The Toymaker
- John R. Walker as Pilot
- Brendan Purcell as Peters
- Peter Svatik as Petrov
- Lux Kapsaski as Olga
- Jon Bard as Dr. Mikhailov
- Cassandra Hodges as Alberta Crow
- Oliver Berry as Robert Crow
- Klemens Koehring as Herzog
- David Lyndon as Landon Fox
- Dennis Farrin as Stoichkov
- Paris Stangl as Romanov
- Alastair Armstrong as Sanders
- Matt Houlihan as Elias
- Christopher Bennett as The Bartender
- Alec James as The Coroner
- Svend Emil Jacobsen as The Chef
- Christian Roberts as Troitsky

== Release ==
The film was released in DVD and VOD in UK on June 24, 2019, and in United States on July 4, 2019.

=== Critical response ===
Culture Crypt gave the film a review score of 20 out of 100 and wrote;

I won’t end with my usual conclusion claiming if Robert comes back again, which he probably will, I won’t be joining him.

mlmillerwrites gave the film negative review and wrote;

If there is another ROBERT movie, I’ll cover it. But it looks like the filmmaker has moved on to other projects, so it looks like Robert can finally be at rest.

== Reboot ==
In June 10, 2026, Flickering Myth announced that they are reuniting with Shepka Productions to reboot the British horror franchise Robert the Doll under IMP Studios and 4Digital Media.
