= Andrew Jones (filmmaker) =

Welsh screenwriter, producer and director (1983–2023)

- Born: 6 October 1983; Swansea, Wales
- Died: 15 January 2023 (aged 39)
- Occupations: Film director, screenwriter
- Years active: 2005–2021

Andrew Jones (6 October 1983 – 15 January 2023) was a Welsh screenwriter, producer and director of low-budget independent feature films, mainly in the horror genre. His most notable and successful releases included the Robert the Doll film series, which found remarkable market share in Germany.

Across his career, Andrew directed or produced more than 30 films via his production company, North Bank Entertainment, which he founded in 2011. In early 2019, Jones estimated that he produced between 4 and 7 films a year. His films were distributed by supermarkets at price points of less than ten pounds, and frequently rebranded - for example, The Midnight Horror Show became Theatre of Fear and Valley of the Witch became Conjuring the Dead. As a director and producer, Jones favoured character-led films, to limit his production's budget and shooting schedule.

Throughout the late 2010s, Jones' films gravitated towards horror films based on true crime stories.

Jones never obtained any formal filmmaking or film production training. He spent the majority of his life with in his hometown of Swansea, alongside his wife, Sharon, who assisted him as a costume designer.

Andrew's work abruptly ceased due to illness in 2019, and he was eventually diagnosed with Cushing's syndrome in 2022. After deteriorating, and a lengthy public appeal to fund appropriate, disability-friendly housing, Jones died on 15 January 2023, at the age of 39.

== Filmography ==
Year	Title	Director	Writer	Producer	Ref.
2006	Teenage Wasteland	Yes	Yes	No	
2008	The Feral Generation	Yes	Yes	No	
2012	One Track Heart: The Story of Krishna Das	No	No	Yes	
2013	The Night of the Living Dead: Resurrection	No	Yes	Yes	
2013	The Amityville Asylum	Yes	Yes	Yes	
2014	The Midnight Horror Show	Yes	Yes	No	
2014	Silent Night, Bloody Night: The Homecoming	No	Yes	Yes	
2014	Valley of the Witch	Yes	Yes	Yes	
2015	The Last House on Cemetery Lane	Yes	Yes	Yes	
2015	Poltergeist Activity	Yes	Yes	Yes	
2015	A Haunting at the Rectory	Yes	Yes	Yes	
2015	Robert	Yes	Yes	Yes	
2016	The Curse of Robert the Doll	Yes	Yes	Yes	
2016	The Exorcism of Anna Ecklund	Yes	Yes	No	
2016	Kill Kane	No	Yes	Yes	
2017	Cabin 28	Yes	No	Yes	
2017	Robert and the Toymaker	Yes	Yes	Yes	
2017	Werewolves of the Third Reich	Yes	Yes	Yes	
2018	Jurassic Predator	Yes	Yes	No	
2018	The Legend of Robert the Doll	Yes	Yes	Yes	
2018	The Legend of Halloween Jack	Yes	Yes	Yes	
2018	Alcatraz	Yes	Yes	Yes	
2019	The Curse of Halloween Jack	Yes	Yes	No	
2019	Bundy and the Green River Killer	Yes	Yes	Yes	
2019	The Filthy Thirteen	Yes	Yes	Yes	
2019	Robert Reborn	Yes	Yes	No	
2019	The Manson Family Massacre	Yes	Yes	Yes	
2019	The Utah Cabin Murders	Yes	Yes	Yes	
2020	The Jonestown Haunting	Yes	Yes	No	
2020	A Killer Next Door	Yes	Yes	Yes	
2020	The Haunting of Margam Castle	Yes	Yes	No	
2021	Alien: Battlefield Earth	Yes	Yes	Yes	
