= Martello Gallery-Key West Art and Historical Museum =

- U.S. National Register of Historic Places
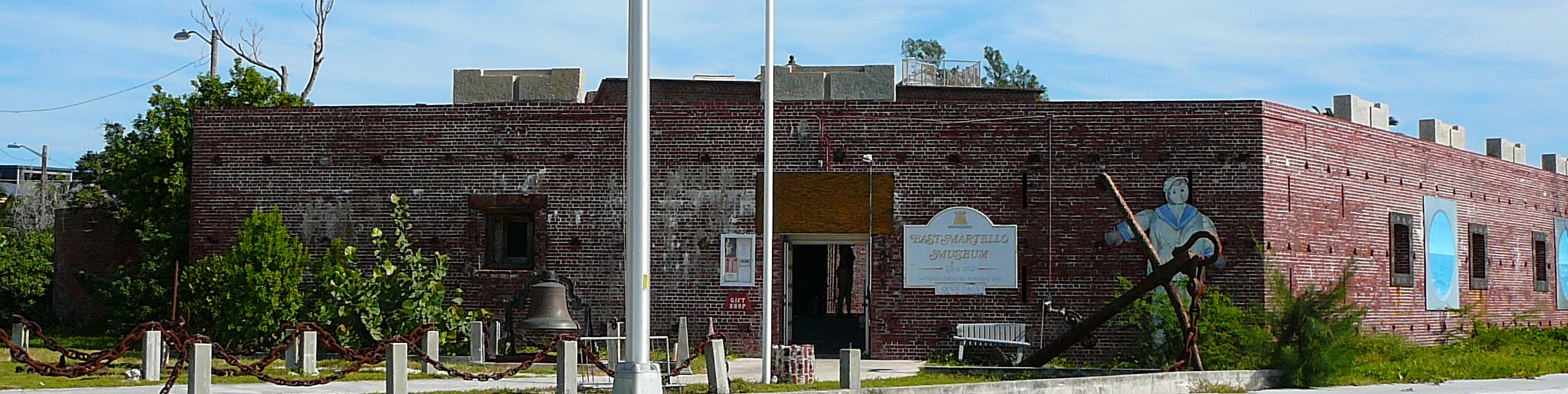

- Location within Florida Location within the United States
- Location: Key West, Florida
- Coordinates: 24°33′7″N 81°45′18″W
- Built: 1862
- NRHP reference No.: 72000341
- Added to NRHP: June 19, 1972

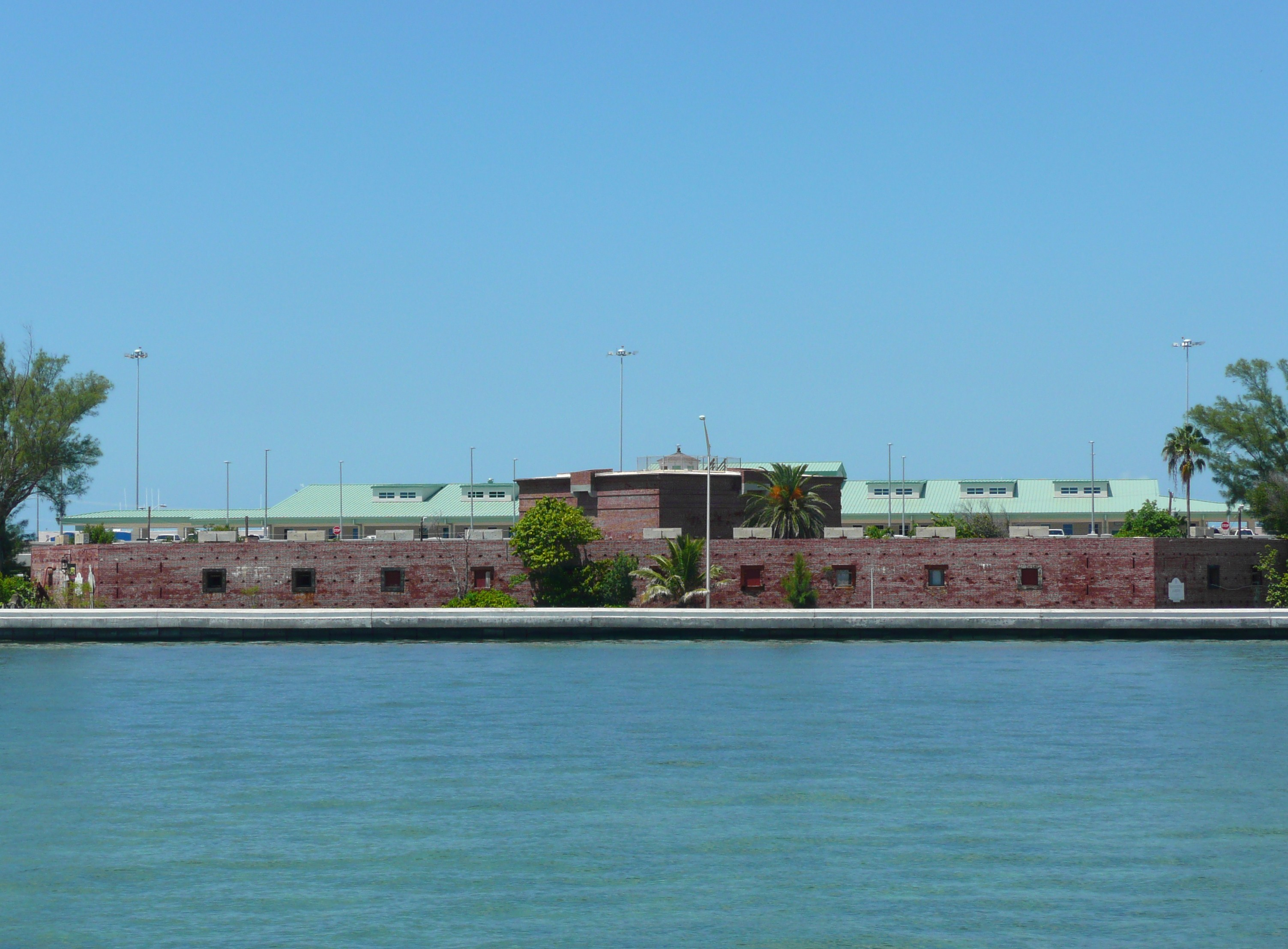
The fort as seen from the Atlantic Ocean

The Fort East Martello Museum & Gardens (also known as the East Martello Tower), is a historic site located at 3501 South Roosevelt Boulevard, Key West, Florida, United States. On June 19, 1972, it was added to the U.S. National Register of Historic Places. It is the best-preserved example of the Martello style of military architecture in the country.

== Fort East Martello Museum & Gardens ==
The site features exhibits of local history and art. Displays include early settlement, sponging and fishing, Cuban influence, military involvement, writers and other characters. The museum features works by folk artist Mario Sanchez, art created from junk by Stanley Papio, and Robert the Doll, a supposedly haunted doll belonging to the late artist Robert Eugene Otto. The Key West Art & Historical Society operates the museum.
