= Celestine Kapsner =

American Catholic priest and exorcist

Reverend Father Celestine Kapsner O.S.B. (April 29, 1892 – January 1973) was a Catholic priest and exorcist who was stationed at St. John's Abbey at Collegeville, Minnesota, in the early 1960s.

== Biography ==
Father Kapsner began working with St. John's parish mission in 1928. Among other duties and activities, Kapsner was in charge of the garden. Kapsner was known to have taken part in exorcisms. He translated a 1928 account of an exorcism by Father Theophilus Riesinger from a German magazine article, and published it, in 1935, in pamphlet form as Begone Satan!.

Father Kapsner died in Minnesota in January 1973. His pamphlet was important because it brought a detailed account of an American exorcism to a large audience for the first time in the United States.

== Published works ==
- The Ordinary of the Mass as a Means of Inculcating Religious Truth; an Essay, 1928
- Begone Satan!, 1935
