= Theophilus Riesinger =

German-American Capuchin friar and priest (1868–1941)

The Reverend Theophilus Riesinger, OFMCap
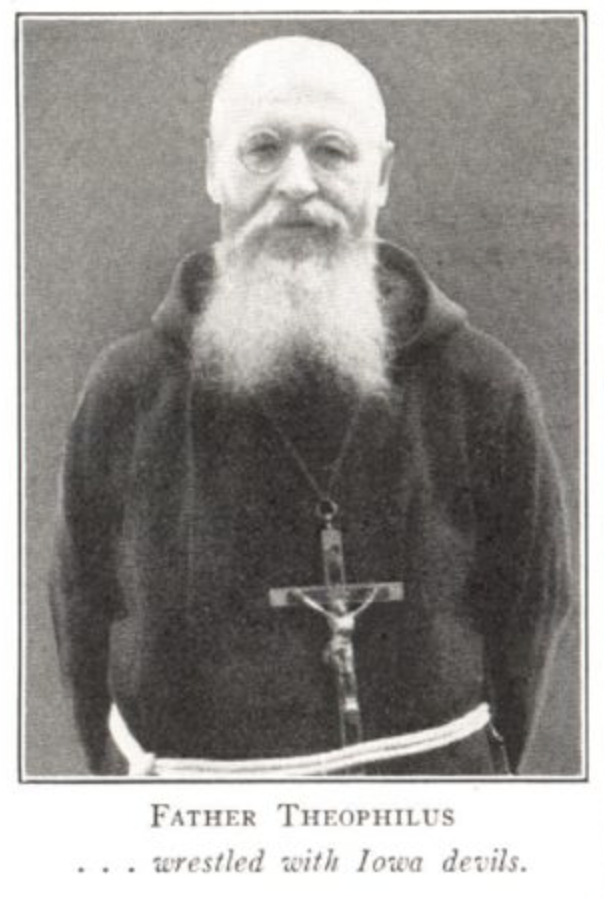
- A portrait of Theophilus Riesinger taken for Time Magazine's 1936 issue on the Earling Exorcism. A caption below reads "Father Theophilus ... wrestled with Iowa devils".
- Church: Roman Catholic Church

Orders
- Ordination: May 29, 1899

Personal details
- Born: Francis Xavier Riesinger; February 27, 1868 Bavaria
- Died: November 9, 1941 (aged 73) Wisconsin, United States

Theophilus Riesinger, OFMCap, born Francis Xavier Riesinger (February 27, 1868 – November 9, 1941) was a German-American Capuchin friar and Roman Catholic priest, who became widely known as an exorcist in the United States due to the highly publicized possession case of Anna Ecklund in 1928.

== Life ==
Riesinger was born in the Kingdom of Bavaria, German Empire. He later moved to the United States, where he entered the Capuchin Order. He was ordained as a priest on 29 June 1899. In the summer of 1928, due to his previous experience as an exorcist in dealing with demonic possessions, he was requested by the Bishop of Des Moines to conduct the rite of exorcism on a Anna Ecklund, a 46-year-old woman who was suspected of being possessed in Earling, Iowa. After 23 days of performing the exorcism, Riesinger was exhausted. Two days before Christmas of that year, he claimed the demons were driven out, and the woman cried "My Jesus! Mercy! Praised be Jesus Christ!" While preaching at a parish mission in St. Joseph Parish in Earling, Iowa, he asked the permission of the pastor to conduct the ceremony in the parish. Receiving this, he chose a convent of Franciscan Sisters on the outskirts of the town for its privacy.

Reverend Pastor Joseph Steiger, who oversaw the exorcism, gave his account to Reverend Carl Vogel in Nazi Germany, who published it as a pamphlet. This piece, titled Begone Satan!, made it back to German-speaking Roman Catholics in the United States and was translated into English in 1935 by Celestine Kapsner, a Benedictine monk of Saint John's Abbey in Collegeville, Minnesota, published with the official imprimatur of the Bishop of St. Cloud, Joseph F. Busch, and the nihil obstat of Bishop John P. Durham. Soon after, the Time magazine published an article covering the pamphlet in February 1936.

Riesinger’s account of the exorcism was recorded by acquaintance Federick J. Bunse in 1934. It was titled The Earling possession case: An exposition of the exorcism of 'Mary', a demoniac. However, the Roman Catholic Church did not give approval for its publication. It remained unpublished until 2020, when it was included in Joseph P. Laycock’s The Penguin Book of Exorcisms. Riesinger died on November 9, 1941. A necrology of Riesinger was placed on the Internet as part of the Capuchin Heritage Series.
