= Robert (film) =

2015 British horror film directed by Andrew Jones

- DVD cover
- Directed by: Andrew Jones
- Written by: Andrew Jones
- Produced by: Emily Coupland; Rebecca Graham; Robert Graham; Andrew Jones
- Starring: Suzie Frances Garton; Lee Bane; Flynn Allen; Judith Haley; Megan Lockhurst
- Cinematography: Jonathan McLaughlin
- Edited by: Morgan Conlon
- Music by: Bobby Cole
- Production company: North Bank Entertainment
- Distributed by: 4Digital Media
- Release date: 24 August 2015
- Running time: 90 minutes
- Country: United Kingdom
- Language: English

Robert (also known as Robert the Doll) is a 2015 British horror film written and directed by Andrew Jones. The first installment in the Robert the Doll film series, it stars Suzie Frances Garton, Lee Bane, Flynn Allen, Judith Haley and Megan Lockhurst. The film was inspired by a haunted doll named Robert.

== Plot ==
Paul Otto, a successful lawyer, and his wife Jenny, an artist, live in a quiet suburban home with their young son, Gene. Concerned about their elderly housekeeper Agatha's declining mental state, they decide to dismiss her. Before leaving, Agatha gives Gene a vintage doll named Robert as a parting gift.

Shortly after Agatha's departure, strange occurrences begin to plague the household. Furniture is found overturned, objects are mysteriously moved, and unsettling giggles echo through the house at night. Gene insists that Robert is responsible for these disturbances, claiming the doll is alive. Jenny starts to believe her son's claims, especially after discovering the word "die" scrawled on a mirror and witnessing the destruction of one of her paintings.

As the supernatural events escalate, Jenny becomes increasingly convinced of Robert's malevolent nature. She suspects the doll of pushing their cleaner, Martha, down the stairs and causing the death of the babysitter, Marcie. However, Paul remains skeptical, attributing Jenny's fears to her past mental health issues.

The family's attempts to rid themselves of the cursed doll prove futile, as Robert's sinister presence continues to torment them. The film culminates in a chilling realization that the true source of the haunting is not the house itself, but the seemingly innocent doll gifted to their son.

== Cast ==
- Suzie Frances Garton as Jenny Otto
- Lee Bane as Paul Otto
- Flynn Allen as Gene Otto
- Judith Haley as Agatha
- Megan Lockhurst as Martha
- Cyd Casados as Debbie
- Samuel Hutchison as Steven
- Annie Davies as Marcie
- Ryan Michaels as Claren

== Release ==
4Digital Media acquired the distribution of the film in UK and US and was released on 24 August 2015.

== Reception ==
On Culture Crypt, the film has a review score of 25 out of 100, indicating "unfavorable reviews".

Corey Danna of Horrornews.net wrote:

Andrew Jones is slowly growing into an interesting filmmaker and he really seems to have a passion for the subject matter. So much passion he’s already hard at work on sequel that will follow Robert the doll to his final resting place of the museum. Hopefully in the sequel, we will get to see the doll in more depth. That’s what this film was missing.

A review on Boca De Inferno found the lack of budget was patent "in every scene".

== Sequels and prequel ==
Four sequels have followed: The Curse of Robert the Doll was released on 12 September 2016, The Toymaker on 21 August 2017, The Revenge of Robert the Doll on 6 March 2018, and Robert Reborn on 24 June 2019.
