= Minor exorcism in Christianity =

Rites or prayers used in Christian churches for persons preparing for baptism

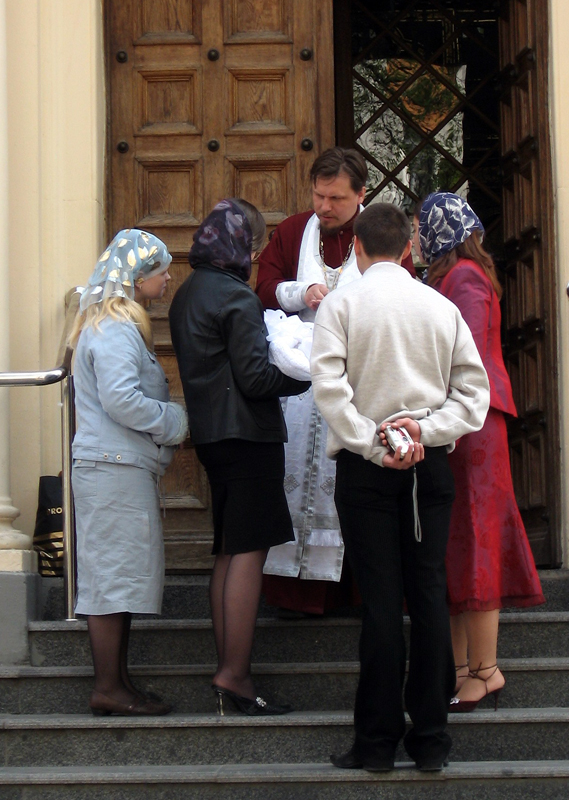
Minor exorcism in Christianity may be done at the door of a church before baptism.

The expression minor exorcism can be used in a technical sense or a general sense. The general sense indicates any exorcism which is not a solemn exorcism of a person believed to be possessed, including various forms of deliverance ministry. This article deals only with the technical sense which specifically refers to certain prayers used with persons preparing to become baptised members of the churches which makes use of such rites. These prayers request God's assistance so that the person to be baptised will be kept safe from the power of Satan or protected in a more general way from temptation.

== Ancient practice ==
As early as the 3rd century of Western Christianity, there is evidence of the existence of four minor orders of clergy in the Latin Church, one of which was entitled 'exorcist'. Pope Cornelius (251–253) noted that among the clergy in Rome there were fifty-two such exorcists, among other ministries listed, and the institution of these orders, and the organization of their functions, seems to have been the work of Cornelius's predecessor, Pope Fabian (236–250).

Text previously attributed to a fourth Council of Carthage in 398, now identified as a collection called Statuta Ecclesiæ Antiqua, prescribes in its seventh canon the rite of ordination of such an exorcist: the bishop is to give him the book containing the formulae of exorcism, saying, "Receive, and commit to memory, and possess the power of imposing hands on energumens, whether baptized or catechumens"; and the same rite was still in use in the early 20th century, except that instead of the ancient Book of Exorcisms, the Roman Pontifical, or Roman Missal, was placed into the hands of the ordinand. The same canons required that those preparing to be baptised (known as catechumens) were to undergo a daily imposition of hands by these exorcists.

The 4th century Mystagogical Catechesis of Cyril of Jerusalem gives a detailed description of baptismal exorcism, from which it appears that anointing with exorcised oil formed a part of this exorcism in the East. Anointing with oil as part of baptismal exorcism is also mentioned in the Apostolic Tradition and the Arabic Canons of Hippolytus – early 20th Century scholarship attributed both of these documents to Hippolytus of Rome, but the origin of both sources is now disputed.

Authors such as Eusebius (3rd century) and Augustine (4th century) provide further details of these minor exorcisms, prayers and ceremonies performed over adults preparing for baptism. Eusebius mentions the imposition of hands and prayer. Among the Latins, and especially at Rome, breathing accompanied with a form of exorcism and placing in the mouth a little exorcised salt, was employed in addition to the signing with the cross and the imposition of hands. Mostly those in the minor order of exorcist performed the ceremony of exorcism, then a priest signed the catechumens with the cross and laid hands upon them. The final ceremony took place on Holy Saturday, when the priest himself performed the ceremony of exorcism.

An exsufflatio, or out-breathing of the demon by the candidate, which was sometimes part of the ceremony, symbolized the renunciation of the Devil, while the insufflatio, or in-breathing of the Holy Spirit, by ministers and assistants, symbolised the infusion of sanctifying grace by the sacrament. Augustine noted that rites of exorcism by exsufflation were also performed for the baptism of infants.

The Lutheran Church, in its 1526 Baptismal Booklet contained a minor exorcism before the small sign of the cross. Similarly, after the English Reformation, the Anglican baptismal rite in the 1549, Book of Common Prayer, which was based on the Sarum Rite, "took place at the church door and included signing with the cross on forehead and breast and an exorcism."

Most of these ancient ceremonies were retained in the Extraordinary Form of the Roman Rite still practiced in the Catholic Church.

== Contemporary practice ==
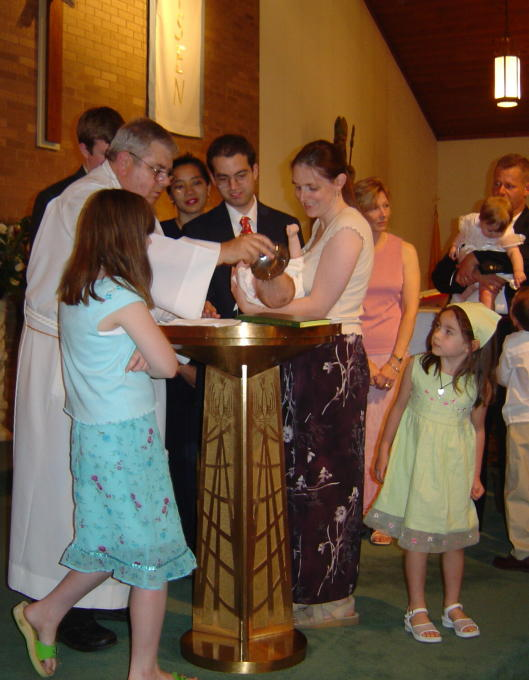
In many Christian denominations, the minor exorcism is an integral part of the baptismal liturgy.

=== Catholicism ===
In 1972, the minor orders were reformed; men preparing to be ordained as Catholic priests or deacons would no longer receive the minor order of exorcist; the minor orders of lector and acolyte were retained, but redesignated as ministries. It was left open to Catholic bishops of individual countries to petition the Vatican to establish a ministry of exorcist if it seemed useful in their territories. Any such lay 'exorcists' should not be confused with priests authorised to conduct major exorcisms of those deemed to be possessed.

As part of the wider reforms of the Second Vatican Council, all Catholic liturgical books were updated, including the rites for the baptism of adults and of children. The revised rites retained prayers designated minor exorcisms, for use during or before the ceremony of baptism itself. These would be performed as a routine part of the normal preparation for Christian baptism.

In 1969, an English translation was released of the Rite of Baptism for Children (later amended 1984). Baptism could now be celebrated by a priest or deacon and included a formula of minor exorcism. This was located in the rite immediately following prayers for the child and a Litany of the Saints, and was immediately followed by an anointing with the oil of catechumens.

The Second Vatican Council also called for adults seeking baptism to be part of a formal process of preparation, or catechumenate, as was the case in the early church. A Rite of Christian Initiation of Adults was therefore prepared after the council, and an interim English edition published in 1974. A revised and expanded version for the United States was published in 1988. The rite includes a selection of eleven texts for minor exorcisms, which may be performed on one or more occasions during the months when a person enrolled as a catechumen is preparing for baptism. Anointing with the oil of catechumens may be repeated on several occasions. The notes also indicate that the minor exorcisms may be carried out by a lay catechist deputed for this purpose by the bishop, though the use of the oil of catechumens is reserved to deacons and priests.

In addition to these exorcisms, the Rite for Adults includes three ceremonies called scrutinies, to be celebrated as integral parts of the Sunday Eucharist on the Third, Fourth, and Fifth Sundays of Lent. Each scrutiny contains a prayer of exorcism reserved to the deacon or priest. There is also a simplified set of prayers provided for use with children mature enough to be personally catechised. The only minor exorcism in the children's rite is part of a one-off scrutiny which is offered in two forms. Both texts use the image of entering the light of Christ, turning respectively from "darkness" and from "whatever could make them bad".

The American ritual book also contains additional prayers to be used with already-baptised Christians preparing to be received into full communion with the Catholic Church, including a one-off scrutiny which may be celebrated on the Second Sunday of Lent. Although it notes that a careful distinction must be made between the exorcisms of catechumens and this penitential rite for baptised adults, one possible prayer over the candidates prays that the candidates may "be freed of ... obstacles and falsehoods" while the other prays that they may "resist all that is deceitful and harmful" and that Jesus would "heal the wounds of their sins".

=== Lutheranism ===
In the Lutheran Church, through its Rite of Exorcism in the Baptismal Liturgy, "the Church has kept an opportunity to teach how serious this falleness' is, and can, through bold proclamations against the devil, teach what a blessing and joy it is to receive the Holy Spirit with the Water and Word of Holy Baptism. Rather than inviting the devil into one by ignoring his presence in all the unbaptized, the Church proclaims boldly his overthrow (James 4:7), and reminds herself, and all her members, who our enemies truly are: the devil, the world, and, yes, even our own sinful flesh. And, the Good News that one dies with Christ, and rises to new life in Him with the Water and the Word, brings us comfort in our battles with our defeated enemies (Romans 6:4; 16:20)."

=== Anglicanism ===
Today, in some provinces of the Anglican Communion, the "Anglican liturgy does not involve an explicit exorcism or rejection of evil, but does including a signing with the cross and the wish that baptism delivers one from 'the powers of darkness'." Others, such as the Anglican Church of Tanzania, however, provide for anointing and consignation that accompanies "the exorcism that follows the examination of the candidates".

=== Methodism ===
The baptismal liturgy used in the United Methodist Church contains a minor exorcism, when the candidate for baptism is asked to reject the 'spiritual forces of wickedness and evil powers of this world'.

== See also ==
- Baptismal vows
- Exorcist
- Exorcism
- Exorcism in the Catholic Church
- Exorcism in Christianity
