= American Exorcism =

2001 non-fiction book by Michael Cuneo

- Author: Michael W. Cuneo
- Publisher: Doubleday
- Publication date: 2001
- ISBN: 9780385501767

American Exorcism: Expelling Demons in the Land of the Plenty is a 2001 book by Michael W. Cuneo and published originally by Doubleday. It follows the experience of Cuneo while he toured the United States of America and witnessed over 50 exorcisms.

== Summary ==
American Exorcism discusses the history and popular culture representation of exorcism in the United States, juxtaposed with Cuneo's experience attending over 50 exorcisms in person. Through his research, Cuneo highlights important figures, such as Malachi Martin, Frank and Ida B. Hammond, and Peter Blatty, as well topics such as the difference between Catholic exorcism and Deliverance ministry. This text discusses the meteoric rise of exorcisms in the United States, especially alongside other technological advancements. Mark Dery, writing for The Washington Post, explained that

Cuneo reads the phenomenon as a backlash by religious conservatives, adrift in a secular society that they perceive as amoral, while at the same time feeling alienated from an increasingly secularized Protestantism or a post-Vatican-II Catholicism. To him, the charismatic ministers and renegade priests are casting out the demons of social change: feminism, the sexual revolution, New Age spirituality and the loss of faith in traditional institutions.

== Reception ==
Kirkus Reviews called American Exorcism "an engaging and detailed document of a provocative subculture [...] that will neither confirm nor confound the reader's demonic fears".

Publishers Weekly referred to the book as "mesmerizing", noting that the book is "lucidly written and riveting as any horror novel". They concluded that "Cuneo's excursion into the darker paths of American faith offers a deeply disturbing, ironic vision of what he sees as the unintended consequences of popular culture for the modern religious imagination."

Mark Dery, writing for The Washington Post, noted that the book is "armed with a wry wit and girded in the armor of an inquiring but 'open-mindedly skeptical' intellect".

Booklist also reviewed the book.
