= Unclean spirit =

Biblical term for the spiritually unclean, demons, and demon-possessed individuals

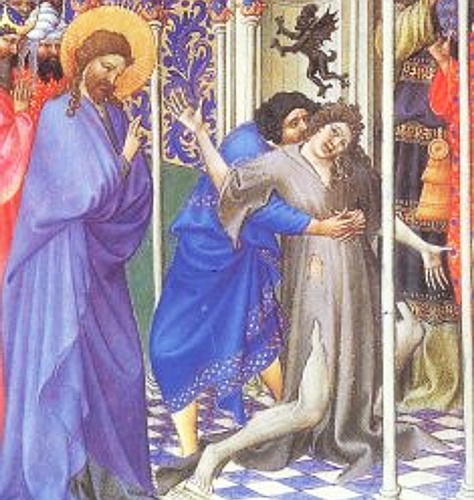
Jesus drives out an unclean spirit, from the 15th-century Très Riches Heures

In English translations of the Bible, unclean spirit is a common rendering of Greek pneuma akatharton (πνεῦμα ἀκάθαρτον; plural pneumata akatharta (πνεύματα ἀκάθαρτα)), which in its single occurrence in the Septuagint translates Hebrew ruaḥ tum'ah (רוּחַ טוּמְאָה).

The Greek term appears 21 times in the New Testament in the context of demonic possession. It is also translated into English as spirit of impurity or more loosely as "evil spirit." The Latin equivalent is spiritus immundus.

The association of physical and spiritual cleanliness is, if not universal, widespread and continues into the 21st century: "To be virtuous is to be physically clean and free from the impurity that is sin," notes an article in Scientific American published 10 March 2009. Some scholarship seeks to differentiate between "unclean spirit" and "evil spirit" (pneuma ponêron) or "demon" (daimonion).

== The concept of pneuma ==
In the Christian scriptures, the word pneuma (plural pneumata) is used variously for the human soul, angelic or demonic spirits, and the Holy Spirit, depending on context or with a grammatical modifier. New Testament usage of the words pneuma and daimonion in relation to demons follows that of later Judaism; the two words are to be distinguished from daimon, which appears only once (at Matthew 8:31) and in classical antiquity has a neutral meaning of "spirit" or "god, demigod." For those who practiced the traditional religions of antiquity, possession by a pneuma could be a desired state of visionary trance.

In the New Testament, the Greek modifier akatharton, although sometimes translated in context as "evil," means more precisely "impure, not purified," and reflects a concern for ritual purification shared with or derived from Judaism, though reinterpreted. In early Christianity, the catechumen was routinely prepared for baptism by exorcism even when demonic possession was not suspected; in the case of adult converts, the "unclean spirits" to be driven away might be identified with the gods of other religions.

The practice of insufflation and exsufflation, or the use of released breath in ritual, depends on conceptualizing a spiritual entity as air in motion, "invisible yet active": both Greek pneuma and Latin spiritus had an original meaning of "breath, mobile air."

== In Judaism ==
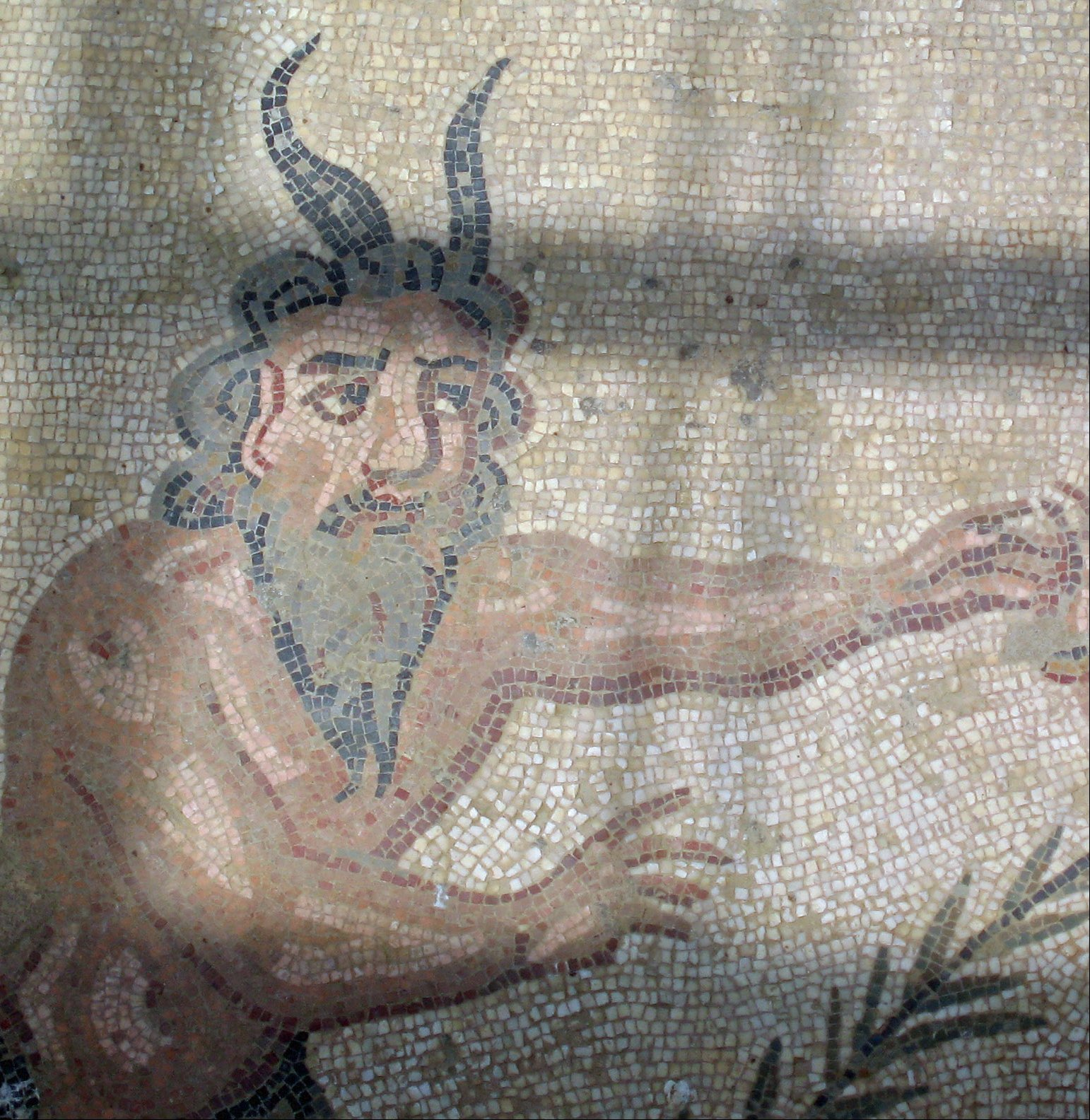
The Hebrew se’irim, or "hairy demon," is sometimes translated "satyr," as depicted here in a Roman mosaic.

References to a "spirit of impurity" or an "evil spirit" (ruaḥ tum'ah) are found in the Hebrew Bible, in Rabbinic literature, and in Pseudepigrapha. It can be difficult to distinguish between a demon and an unclean or evil spirit in Judaic theology or contemporary scholarship; both entities like to inhabit wild or desolate places. Commonly the unclean spirit refers to Dybbuks, spirits of deceased persons who were not laid to rest and thus became demons. Other demonic entities are shedim, which appears only twice in the Tanakh; originally a loan-word from Akkadian for a protective, benevolent spirit (sedu), but from Jewish perspective were foreign gods and according to established Jewish lore own beings, created by Jahwe.

The se’irim or śa‘ir are goat-demons or "hairy demons" (sometimes translated as "satyrs") associated with other harmful supernatural beings and with ruins, i.e., human structures that threaten to revert to the wild. The demonic figure Azazel, depicted with goat-like features and in one instance as an unclean bird, is consigned to desert places as impure. The Babylonian Talmud says that a person who wanted to attract an impure spirit might fast and spend the night in a cemetery; in the traditional religions of the Near East and Europe, one ritual mode for seeking a divinely inspired revelation or prophecy required incubation at the tomb of an ancestor or hero. A cemetery, already a locus of "unclean" spirits or a multiplicity of gods, was considered an appropriate dump when biblical leaders destroy sacred objects of other religions or statues representing the gods. To pneuma to akatharton appears in the Septuagint at Zechariah 13:2, where pseudoprophetai ("false prophets") speak in the name of Yahweh but are possessed by an unclean spirit. This occurrence of "unclean spirit" is unique in the Tanakh; the Hebrew is rûah hattum’â.

The syncretic magical practice of late antiquity drew on Hebraic elements, and spells from the Greek Magical Papyri evoke and attempt to command Jewish angels, demons, and other beings regarded as spiritually powerful. At one point, a compiler of the magical text emphasizes the Jewish aspect of purity, insisting that "this spell is Hebraic and is preserved among pure men", advising that the practitioner should keep himself pure and refrain from eating pork. The spell concludes with a protracted insufflation. A tradition of Solomonic exorcism continued into medieval Europe; an example is recorded by Gregory the Thaumaturge: "I adjure you all unclean spirits by Elohim, Adonai, Sabaoth, to come out and depart from the servant of God."

Exorcism is the most thoroughly attested Jewish magical practice of the Second Temple period. The exorcistic technique of fumigation by incense depends on the aerial conception of the unclean spirit: the occupation of air by odor or smoke (i.e., airborne particulate matter) was supposed to drive off or displace an unclean spirit. Since either body or soul could be unclean, it can be difficult to distinguish exorcism from traditional magico-medical practice in which a personified illness is adjured to depart from the patient's body (for instance, "Flee, Fever!") by means of a charm, spoken or inscribed on an amulet or other ritual object. In some rabbinic literature, demons are viewed as inflicting evil on humans in part through illness and disease, though Mishnah and Tannaitic scholars in Palestine did not view demons as the cause of illness.

== In Christianity ==
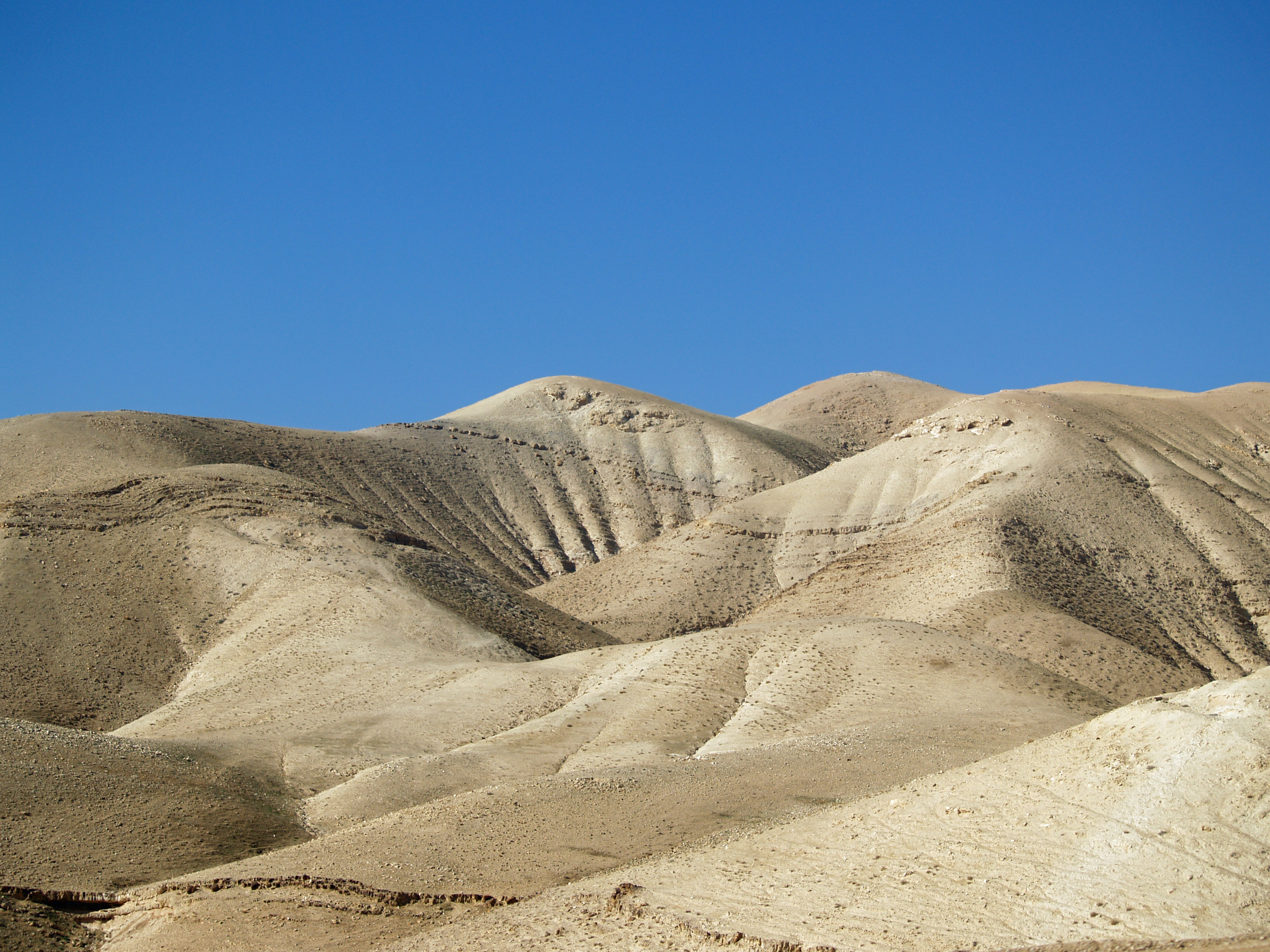
Judean desert, a liminal space thought hospitable to unclean spirits (Matthew 12:43)

The exorcism of demons and unclean spirits is one of the major categories of miracles attributed to Jesus. In the Greek New Testament, 20 occurrences of pneuma akatharton (singular and plural) are found in the Synoptic Gospels, Acts of the Apostles, and the Book of Revelation. The phrase may be used instead of daimonion (50 occurrences) or a verbal form of daimonizesthai, "to be possessed by a demon" or "to be or act as a demoniac," as indicated by usage in parallel versions of the same story. Throughout The Gospel of Mark, the terms pneuma (with a pejorative modifier) and daimonion seem to be equivalent.

The exorcism of an unclean spirit was the first act of Jesus's public ministry:

^{21}They went to Capernaum, and when the Sabbath came, Jesus went into the synagogue and began to teach. ^{22}The people were amazed at his teaching, because he taught them as one who had authority, not as the teachers of the law. ^{23}Just then a man in their synagogue who was possessed by an unclean spirit cried out, ^{24}"What do you want with us, Jesus of Nazareth? Have you come to destroy us? I know who you are — the Holy One of God!" ^{25}"Be quiet!" said Jesus sternly. "Come out of him!" ^{26}The unclean spirit shook the man violently and came out of him with a shriek. ^{27}The people were all so amazed that they asked each other, "What is this? A new teaching — and with authority! He even gives orders to unclean spirits and they obey him." ^{28}News about him spread quickly over the whole region of Galilee.

Jesus is said to have directly granted his 12 disciples the power to cast out unclean spirits and to heal. At Luke 9:49–50, John the Apostle reports that he and his fellow disciples have asked a man to stop casting out demons in the name of Jesus "because he isn't one of us," but Jesus replies that the man should be allowed to continue, since "anyone who is not against you is for you." Elsewhere, Jesus appoints 72 missionaries who also have the power to cast out demons.

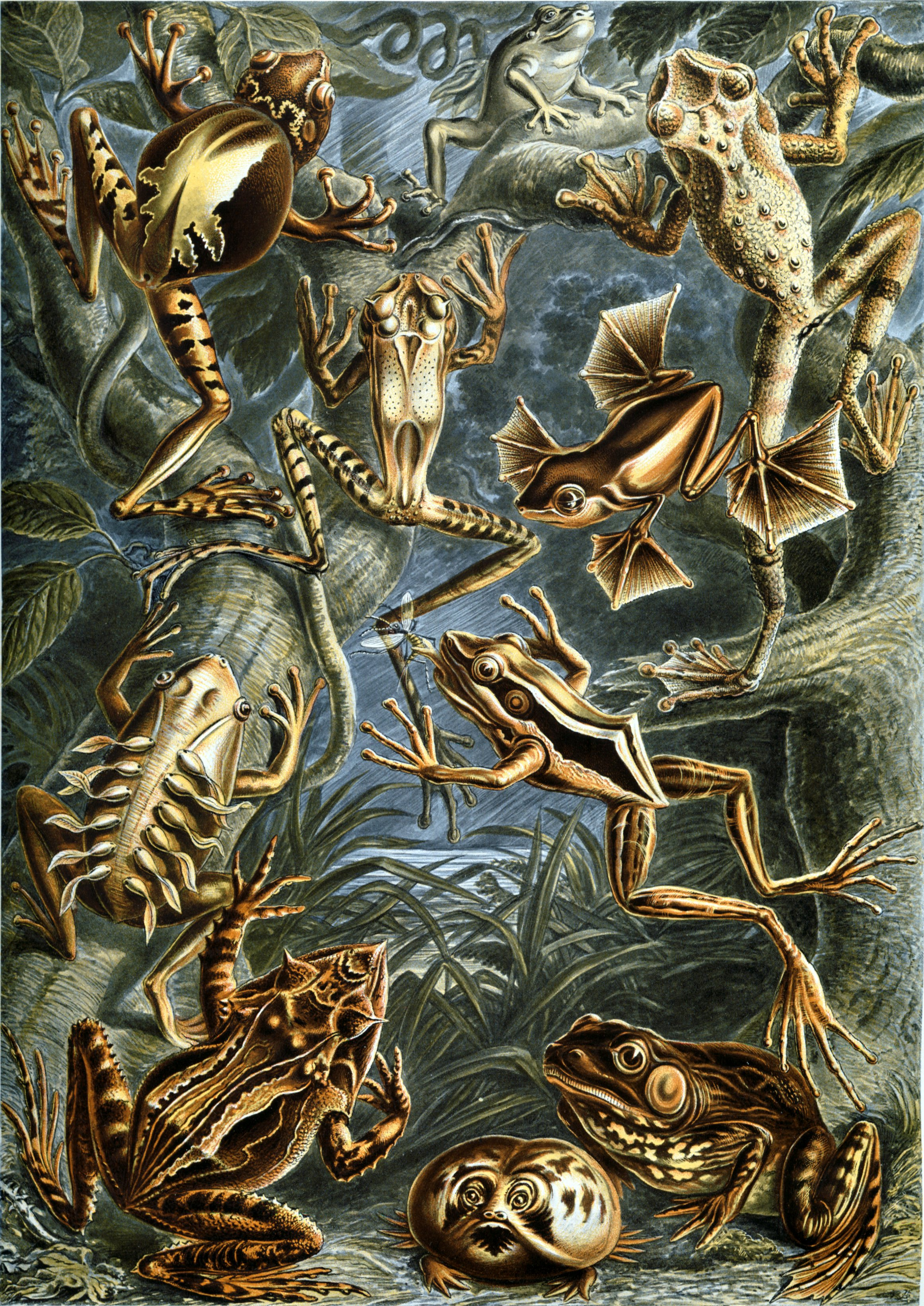
Frogs of the amphibian class Batrachia (Haeckel, 1904); Revelation compares three pneumata to frogs (Greek batrachoi), an unclean animal

=== Animals and liminality ===
The attribution of animal-like qualities to demons continues from the Jewish tradition; like demons, animals may be classified as "unclean." Revelation 16:13 describes "three unclean spirits like frogs" (pneumata tria akatharta hôs batrachoi); frogs are unclean as animals for food in the Jewish dietary code. The association of unclean spirits with liminal areas such as ruins, cemeteries, and deserts also continues from Judaic belief; Revelation 18:2 speaks of the future ruin of Babylon as "a dwelling place of every unclean spirit and a haunt of every unclean and hateful bird."

Both animalism and transitional, liminal sites (marked in bold following) are involved in perhaps the most famous manifestation of an unclean spirit in the New Testament, the Gerasene demon whose name is Legion:

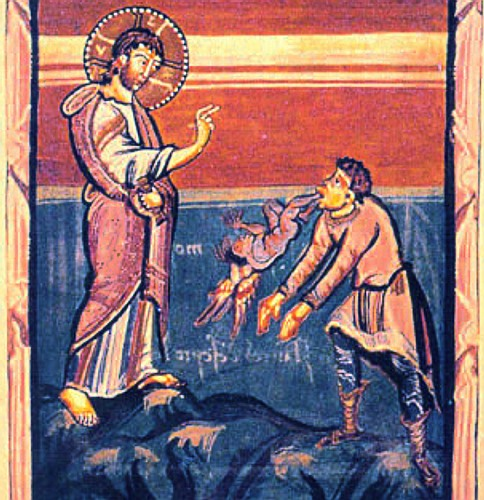
Medieval illustration of Jesus casting out the unclean Gerasene demon

^{1}And they [Jesus and his followers] came to the other side of the sea, as into the country of the Gerasenes. ^{2} And when he was come out of the boat, straightway there met him out of the tombs a man with an unclean spirit (pneumati akathartoi), ^{3}who had his dwelling in the tombs: and no man could any more bind him, no, not with a chain; ^{4}because that he had been often bound with fetters and chains, and the chains had been rent asunder by him, and the fetters broken in pieces: and no man had strength to tame him. ^{5}And always, night and day, in the tombs and in the mountains, he was crying out, and cutting himself with stones. ^{6}And when he saw Jesus from afar, he ran and worshipped him; ^{7}and crying out with a loud voice, he saith, What have I to do with thee, Jesus, thou Son of the Most High God? I adjure thee by God, torment me not. ^{8}For he said unto him, Come forth, thou unclean spirit (pneuma akatharton), out of the man. ^{9}And he asked him, What is thy name? And he saith unto him, My name is Legion; for we are many. ^{10}And he besought him much that he would not send them away out of the country. ^{11}Now there was there on the mountain side a great herd of swine feeding. ^{12}And they besought him, saying, Send us into the swine, that we may enter into them. ^{13}And he gave them leave. And the unclean spirits (ta pneumata ta akatharta) came out, and entered into the swine: and the herd rushed down the steep bank into the sea, in number about two thousand; and they were drowned in the sea. ^{14}And they that fed them fled, and told it in the city, and in the country. And they came to see what it was that had come to pass. ^{15}And they come to Jesus, and behold him that was possessed with demons sitting, clothed and in his right mind, even him that had the legion: and they were afraid. ^{16}And they that saw it declared unto them how it befell him that was possessed with demons, and concerning the swine. ^{17}And they began to beseech him to depart from their borders. ^{18}And as he was entering into the boat, he that had been possessed with demons besought him that he might be with him. ^{19}And he suffered him not, but saith unto him, Go to thy house unto thy friends, and tell them how great things the Lord hath done for thee, and how he had mercy on thee. ^{20}And he went his way, and began to publish in Decapolis how great things Jesus had done for him: and all men marvelled.

The pig is a suitable recipient because it is an unclean animal. "It was certainly not very kind to the pigs," the philosopher Bertrand Russell remarked, "to put the devils into them and make them rush down the hill to the sea." The need for the demonic pneuma to transmigrate into another body is expressed also at Matthew 12:43, where desert is a haunt for the restless spirit:

When an unclean spirit comes out of a man, it goes through arid places seeking rest and does not find it.

=== Pneuma poneron ===
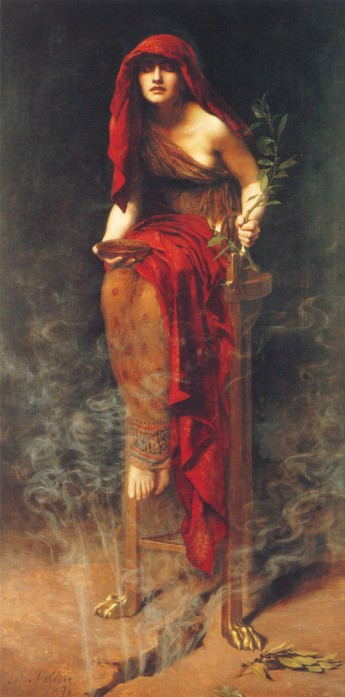
Priestess of Delphi (1891) by John Collier; the Pythia was inspired by a pneuma rising from below

The phrase pneuma poneron (πνεῦμα πονηρόν, "evil spirit") is used several times in the Septuagint, the New Testament and also in patristic texts as an alternative to pneuma akatharton.

The divinatory trance of the Pythia — the female oracle of Apollo at Delphi — is attributed by the 4th-century patristic authority John Chrysostom to a pneuma poneron:

The Pythia is seated on Apollo's tripod, her legs spread. An evil spirit (pneuma poneron) rises from below, enters her vagina, and fills her with madness. Her hair is disheveled, and foam flows from her mouth: she is like a bacchante. And it is in such a state that she speaks.

Chrysostom uses the phrase pneuma poneron frequently in his writings; it is typically translated "evil spirit." The nature of the vapors that inspired the Pythia has been the subject of much debate; see Science and the Pythia. For the Greeks, the Pythia was characterized by sexual purity; her virginity is asserted in some sources, but in others she is said only to have dressed as a virgin and to have lived chastely, and was either an old woman or a married woman who gave up her family and carnal relations to serve the god. A spell invoking Apollo in the Greek Magical Papyri requires ritual purification in the form of dietary restrictions and sexual abstinence; the spell implies that a sexual union with the god will result. The vapors said to arise from the grotto at Delphi were a pneuma enthousiastikon, "inspiring exhalation," according to Plutarch. Although the vaginal reception of the pneuma may strike the 21st-century reader as strange, fumigation was a not uncommon gynecological regimen throughout the Hippocratic Corpus and was employed as early as 1900–1500 BC in ancient Egyptian medicine. Gynecological fumigation was also a technique of traditional Jewish medicine. The intertwining of the medical and divinatory arts in Apollonian religion was characterized as demonic by Christian writers. As a form of ritual purification, fumigation was intended to enhance the Pythia's receptivity to divine communication; to the men of the Church, the open vagina that served no reproductive purpose was an uncontrolled form of sexuality that invited demonic influence, necessarily rendering the Pythia's prophecies false.

==== Pneuma pythona ====
The phrase pneuma pythona (or puthona) means "Pythonian spirit" or "divinatory spirit," and occurs only once in the New Testament. In Acts 16:16–18, after Paul and Silas visit a woman of Thyatira, they are greeted on their way to synagogue by a "working girl" (paidiskê), a slave who has earned a reputation as a gifted diviner; she is said to have a pneuma pythona, not akatharton or poneron, though the spirit is presumed to be evil. Through her employment she earns significant income for her masters. The adjective pythona indicates a connection to the cult of Apollo, regarded as the greatest of the Greek oracular gods; she is nevertheless inspired to acknowledge out loud that the two missionaries of the "most high god" (theos hypsistos; see also Hypsistarians) know the way to salvation. For several days, she repeatedly voices this praise of Christianity. Although it is unclear why a Christian would dispute the truth of the paidiskê's message, and although Jesus himself had said "anyone who is not against you is for you" (see above and Luke 9:49–50), Paul eventually grows annoyed and commands the pneuma to leave her.

This encounter differs from other exorcisms in the New Testament. Unlike Jesus, who usually heals at first contact, Paul drives away the spirit only after several days. The girl is depicted as neither physically tormented nor insane. A spell from the Greek Magical Papyri shows that the possessing pneuma could be welcomed as a giver of vision:

Greetings, spirit (pneuma) who enters into me, seizes me and then departs from me graciously in accordance with the will of the god … .

Paul saw the competing gods of the pagan Greeks as demons. There is no crowd to witness Paul's miracle and proclaim the deed, but later the masters of the paidiskê haul Paul and Silas into court for depriving them of a profitable business.

The message itself is composed of two patterns characteristic of Hellenistic oracle: a recognition ("These men are … "), and a commendation of their trustworthiness. The only divinely inspired speech by a woman recorded in the Acts is that of the paidiskê, but she is characterized as mantic rather than prophetic. Although both are forms of divination, Plato had distinguished the two: the mantis became the mouthpiece of the god through possession, but the "prophecy of interpretation" required specialized knowledge of how to read signs and omens and was considered a rational process. The '"prophet" (προφήτης), usually male, could interpret the divinely inspired speech of a mantic.

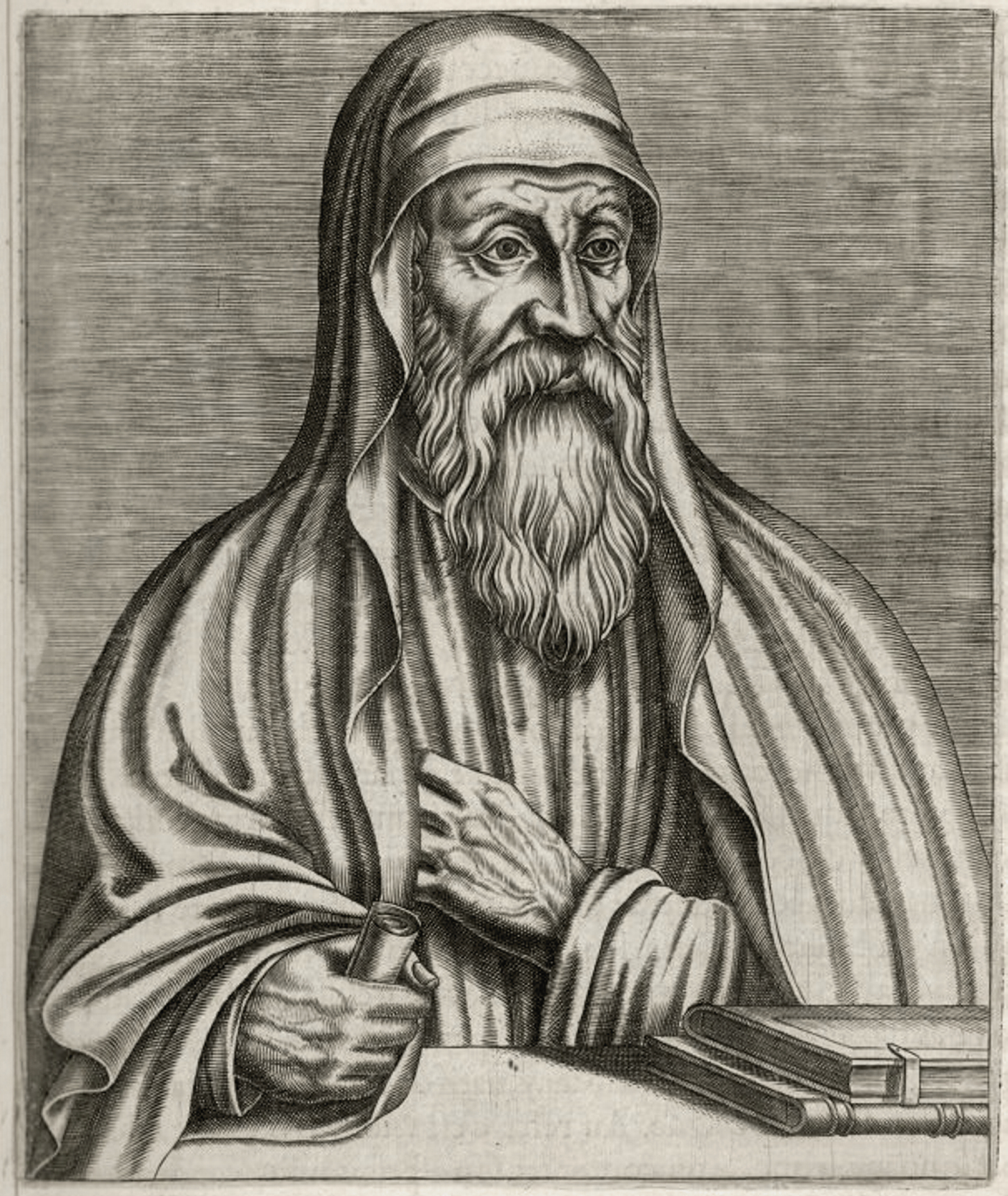
Origen

Plutarch gives Pythones as a synonym for engastrimythoi ("belly-talkers" or "ventriloquists"), a suspect type of mantic who employed trickery in projecting a voice, sometimes through a device such as a mechanical snake. The snake was probably the chosen medium because of its association in myth with Delphi, where Apollo killed the serpent (the Python) to establish his own oracle there. Plutarch and other ancient authors scoff at the notion that the god himself enters the body of a paid mantic for use as a mouthpiece. The early Church Fathers, however, attributed the behavior of engastrimythoi to demonic possession. Like Chrysostom, the early Christian theologian Origen finds the Pythia's receptive vagina disturbing and uses the gender of Apollo's oracle as a way to disparage the Delphic religion, saying that if Apollo were a true god, he would have chosen a male prophet:

If the Delphian Apollo were a god, as the Greeks suppose, would he not rather have chosen as his prophet some wise man? or if such an one was not to be found, then one who was endeavouring to become wise? How came he not to prefer a man to a woman for the utterance of his prophesies? And if he preferred the latter sex, as though he could only find pleasure in the breast of a woman, why did he not choose among women a virgin to interpret his will?

The sexual purity of a male prophet is not at issue, but sexual activity renders a woman unfit. The implication of sexual union between the god and a mortal woman is again viewed as a dangerous deception.

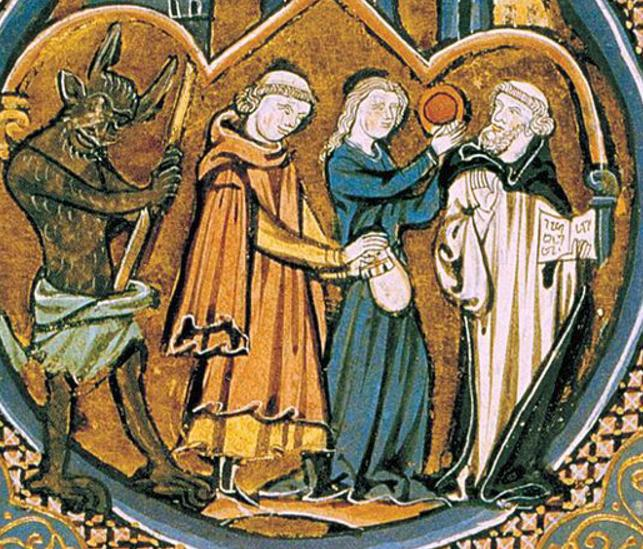
Demonic porneia in a 13th-century allegorization of lust

=== Pneumata plana ===
In one of his epistles to Timothy, Paul defines apostates as those who are drawn to "deceiving" or "seductive" spirits (pneumasin planois) and demonic teachings (didaskaliais daimoniôn). 1 John 4:6 refers to: to pneuma tês planês, "the spirit of error."

These pneumata plana are also found frequently in the apocryphal Testaments of the Twelve Patriarchs, where they threaten to lead astray the Israelites into varieties of immorality. The "seven spirits of deceit" are porneia (sexual sins), gluttony, anger, hypocrisy, arrogance, lying, and injustice; "besides all these, the spirit of sleep, the eighth spirit, is conjoined with error and fantasy."

=== Pneuma astheneias ===
The phrase pneuma astheneias, "spirit of infirmity" or "spirit of weakness," is unique in the New Testament to the Gospel of Luke, as is the story in which it appears:

^{10}And he was teaching in one of the synagogues on the sabbath day. ^{11}And behold, a woman that had a spirit of infirmity eighteen years; and she was bowed together, and could in no wise lift herself up. ^{12}And when Jesus saw her, he called her, and said to her, Woman, thou art loosed from thine infirmity. ^{13}And he laid his hands upon her: and immediately she was made straight, and glorified God.

Luke is the gospel writer who was a physician, and while his profession may have motivated his interest, nothing suggests a medical diagnosis. Asthenia throughout the New Testament means "weakness" or "powerlessness" of any kind, including sickness. Some have seen the affliction as ankylosing spondylitis, but an alternative interpretation is that hard labor over the years had bent the woman's back. The incident has been examined at length from the perspective of feminist theology by Francis Taylor Gench, who views it as both healing and liberating; Jesus goes on to say that the woman has been freed from a kind of bondage to Satan. The breaking of bonds or chains is often associated with freedom from an unclean spirit; in the case of the Gerasene demon (above), the demoniac had the physical power to break chains as a result of possession.

=== Pneuma alalon ===
The pneuma alalon is a speechless spirit who renders the possessed mute (Greek alalon, "without speech"). It thus differs from most possessing demons, who are given to taunts and mockery (diabolos, the origin of both "diabolic" and "Devil," means "slanderer" in Greek). Mark 9:14–29 relates that a boy is brought to Jesus for healing because he cannot speak; verse 25 adds that he cannot hear. This demonic possession manifests itself through symptoms that resemble epilepsy, as is suggested also by Matthew 17:15, who uses a form of the colloquial verb seleniazetai ("moonstruck") for the condition. Although traditionally epilepsy was regarded as "the sacred disease," Jews and Christians attributed the affliction to a demon. The Babylonian Talmud specifies that a child's epilepsy was caused by "the demon of the privy," which attached to the father when he had sex too soon after relieving himself; that is, he was impure:

After coming back from the lavatory (bet ha-kissê), one should wait [some time] before sexual intercourse, as the demon of the lavatory accompanies him. If he does not wait, the offspring will be epileptic.

==== Unforgivable sin ====
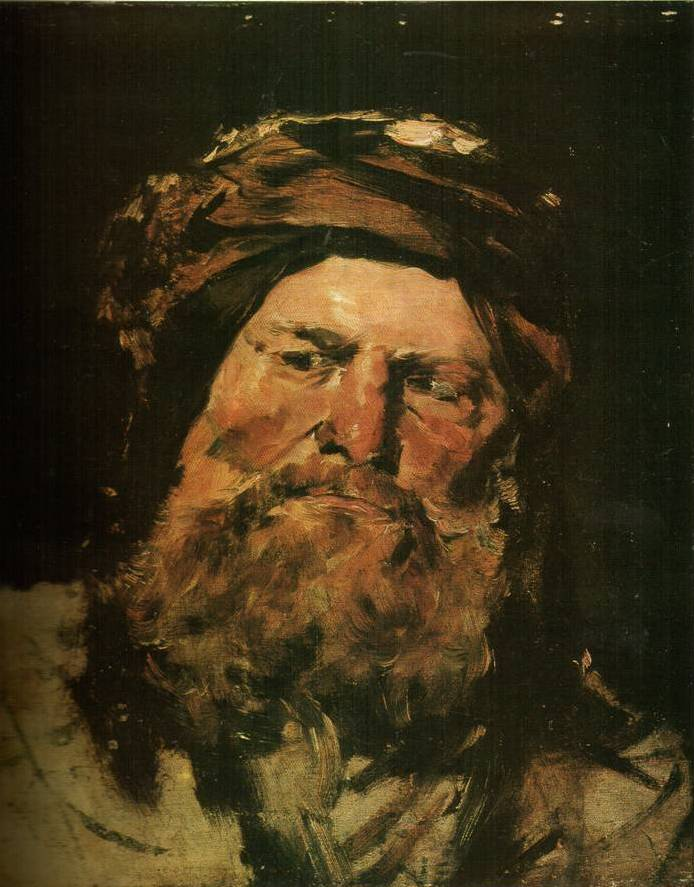
Head of a Pharisee (Mihály Munkácsy, 1881)

Before Jesus, exorcism had been conducted by a trained practitioner who offered a diagnosis and administered a ritual usually employing spoken formularies, amulets or other objects, or compounds of substances resembling pharmacological recipes of the time. Jesus's approach seemed radical because it depended on spiritual authority alone. Jesus casts out the pneuma alalon in front of a crowd who exclaim "Nothing like this has ever happened in Israel!" The Pharisees, also witnesses, counter that "the leader of the demons gives him power to force out demons." This accusation leads to the "Beelzebub controversy." Mark 3:29–30 warns that attributing the power of the Holy Spirit to possession by an "unclean spirit" is a sin that cannot be forgiven. The theological concept is difficult and subject to varying interpretations.

In Mark 3:20–22, Jesus returns home from performing miracles, but a crowd gathers: "There were so many people that Jesus and his followers could not eat. When his family heard this, they went to get him because they thought he was out of his mind. But the teachers of the law from Jerusalem were saying, 'Beelzebul is living inside him! He uses his power from the ruler of demons to force demons out of people'." In his response to this accusation, Jesus says that speaking out against the Holy Spirit is an unforgivable sin: "Jesus said this because the people were saying that he had an evil spirit in him." Luke 12:10 clarifies that "if you speak against the Son of Man, you can be forgiven, but if you speak against the Holy Spirit, you cannot be forgiven."

=== Early Christian exorcism ===
In the period of post-Apostolic Christianity, baptism and the Eucharist required the prior riddance of both unclean spirits and illness. Because the possessing demon was conceptualized as a pneuma or spiritus, each of which derives from a root meaning "breath," one term for its expulsion was exsufflation, or a "blowing out."

Exorcistic texts with Christian content have been found in papyri along with syncretic magic spells; in one Greek example of a fragmentary leaf from a codex, an exorcism that alludes to the birth of Jesus and his miracles appears along with a spell for silencing opponents, an invocation of the Serpent, a spell against a thief, a spell to achieve an erection, a "sacred stele," and a series of magical letters (χαρακτῆρες). The exorcism is distinguished from other early Christian magic charms that quote Bible verses and Psalms by its use of liturgical antiphonies and references to Christian creed.

The unclean spirit associated with a particular possession, or feared possession, might be identified as an individual and named. Gyllou, a type of reproductive demon that appears on Aramaic amulets in late antiquity, is described in a Greek text as "abominable and unclean" (μιαρὰ καὶ ἀκάθαρτος, miara kai akathartos), and is the object of a prayer to the Virgin Mary asking for protection.

=== Spiritus immundus ===
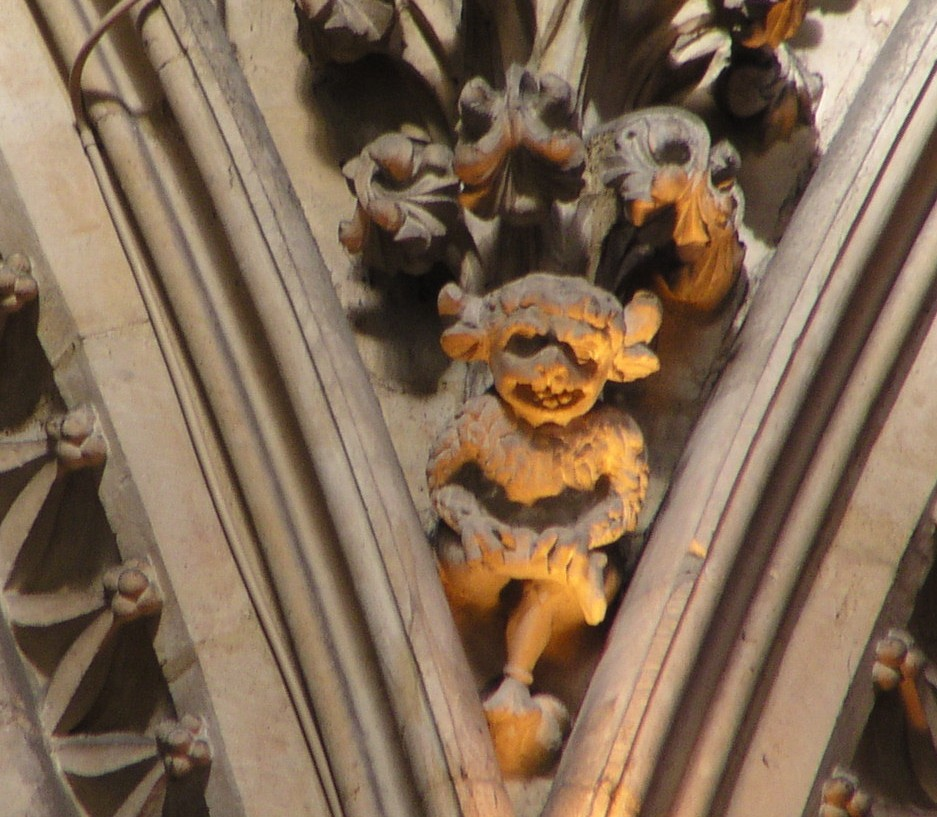
Imp of the Lincoln Cathedral

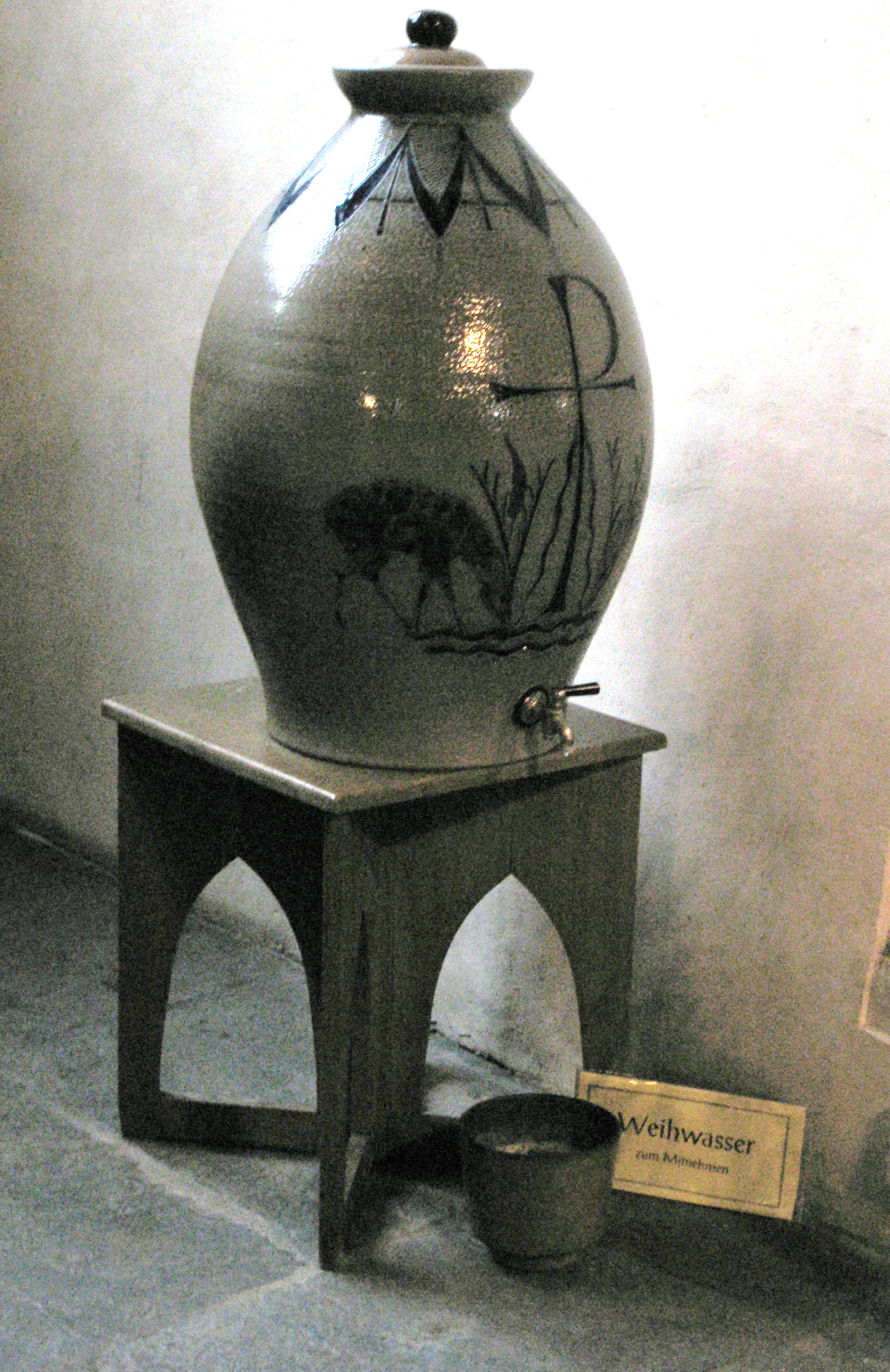
Cask of holy water at Limburg Cathedral, with a sign reading "Holy water to take away"

In his Decretum, Burchard of Worms asserts that "we know that unclean spirits (spiritus immundi) who fell from the heavens wander about between the sky and earth," drawing on the view expressed in the Moralia in Job of Gregory I. In his penitential, Burchard says that some people wait until cock's crow — that is, dawn — to go outdoors because they feared spiritus immundi. The fear is not treated as groundless; rather, Burchard recommends Christ and the sign of the cross as protection, rather than reliance on the cock's crow. The exact nature of these immundi is unclear: they may have been demons, woodland beings such as imps, or ghosts of the unhallowed dead.

==== Latin liturgy and exorcism ====
Spiritus immundus is the term corresponding to pneuma akatharton to address the demon in Latin exorcisms; see Of Exorcisms and Certain Supplications for text from a modern solemn exorcism adjuring the "unclean spirit" to depart a possessed person. In Celtic Rite, the unclean spirit is evoked and exorcized per deum patrem omnipotentem, "by God, All-powerful Father"; the same phrase is used in both Gallican (exorcidio te, spiritus immunde) and Milanese exorcism. The Milanese rite prescribes exsufflation: Exsufflat in faciem ejus in similitudinem crucis dum dicit ("Breathe out onto [the subject's] face in the likeness of the cross while speaking").

Such exorcisms are performed rarely by the 21st-century Western church; the more common exorcism involves the ritual preparation of holy water (aquae). The 9th-century Stowe Missal preserves an early Celtic formula as procul ergo hinc, iubente te, domine, omnis spiritus immundus abscedat ("Therefore at your bidding, Lord, let every unclean spirit depart far from here"). In a Latin version of The Blessing of the Waters on the Eve of Epiphany performed in Rome and recorded at the turn of the 19th–20th centuries, the unclean spirit is commanded per Deum vivum ("by the Living God"). The modern Latin rite to exorcize holy water banishes any "pestilent spirit" (spiritus pestilens) or "corrupting atmosphere" (corrumpens aura); see Rituals and uses of holy water.

== See also ==
- Demon

== Selected bibliography ==
- Aune, David Edward. Prophecy in Early Christianity and the Ancient Mediterranean World. William B. Eerdmans Publishing, 1983. Limited preview online.
- DDD = Dictionary of Deities and Demons in the Bible. Edited by Karel van der Toorn, Bob Becking, and Pieter Willem van der Horst. William B. Eerdmans Publishing, 1999, 2nd edition. Limited preview online.
- A Dictionary of Biblical Tradition in English Literature. David Lyle Jeffrey, general editor. William B. Eerdmans Publishing, 1992. Limited preview online.
- Eerdmans Dictionary of the Bible. Edited by David Noel Freedman, Allen C. Myers, Astrid B. Beck. William B. Eerdmans Publishing, 2000. Limited preview online.
- Matthews, Shelly. First Converts: Rich Pagan Women and the Rhetoric of Mission in Early Judaism and Christianity. Stanford University Press, 2001. Limited preview online.
- Wahlen, Clinton. Jesus and the Impurity of Spirits in the Synoptic Gospels. Mohr Siebeck, 2004. Limited preview online.
