= Insufflation =

Ritual act of blowing, breathing, hissing, or puffing

In religious and magical practice, insufflation and exsufflation are ritual acts of blowing, breathing, hissing, or puffing that signify variously expulsion or renunciation of evil or of the devil (the Evil One), or infilling or blessing with good (especially, in religious use, with the Spirit or grace of God).

In historical Christian practice, such blowing appears most prominently in the liturgy, and is connected almost exclusively with baptism and other ceremonies of Christian initiation, achieving its greatest popularity during periods in which such ceremonies were given a prophylactic or exorcistic significance, and were viewed as essential to the defeat of the devil or to the removal of the taint of original sin.

Ritual blowing occurs in the liturgies of catechumenate and baptism from a very early period and survives into the modern Roman Catholic, Greek Orthodox, Maronite, and Coptic rites. Catholic liturgy post-Vatican II (the so-called novus ordo 1969) has largely done away with insufflation, except in a special rite for the consecration of chrism on Maundy Thursday. Protestant liturgies typically abandoned it very early on. The Tridentine Catholic liturgy retained both an insufflation of the baptismal water and (like the present-day Orthodox and Maronite rites) an exsufflation of the candidate for baptism, right up to the 1960s:

[THE INSUFFLATION] He breathes thrice upon the waters in the form of a cross, saying: Do You with Your mouth bless these pure waters: that besides their natural virtue of cleansing the body, they may also be effectual for purifying the soul.

THE EXSUFFLATION. The priest breathes three times on the child in the form of a cross, saying: Go out of him...you unclean spirit and give place to the Holy Spirit, the Paraclete.

== Insufflation vs. exsufflation ==
From an early period, the act had two distinct but not always distinguishable meanings: it signified on the one hand the derisive repudiation or exorcism of the devil; and, on the other, purification and consecration by and inspiration with the Holy Spirit. The former is technically "exsufflation" ("blowing out") and the latter "insufflation" ("blowing in"), but ancient and medieval texts (followed by modern scholarship) make no consistent distinction in usage. For example, the texts use not only Latin insufflare ('blow in') and exsufflare ('blow out'), or their Greek or vernacular equivalents, but also the simplex sufflare ('blow'), halare ('breathe'), inspirare, exspirare, etc.

Typical is the 8th-century Libellus de mysterio baptismatis of Magnus of Sens, one of a number of responses to a questionnaire about baptism circulated by Charlemagne. In discussing insufflation as a means of exorcising catechumens, Magnus combines a variety of mostly exsufflation-like functions≈

"Those who are to be baptised are insufflated by the priest of God, so that the Prince of Sinners [i.e. the devil] may be put to flight from out of them, and that entry for the Lord Christ might be prepared, and that by his insufflation they might be made worthy to receive the Holy Spirit."

This double role appears as early as Cyril of Jerusalem's 4th-century Mystagogic Catacheses; as Edward Yarnold notes, "Cyril attributes both negative and positive effects [to insufflation]. … The rite of breathing on the [baptismal] candidate has the negative effect of blowing away the devil (exsufflation) and the positive effect of breathing in grace (insufflation)."

== History ==
=== Early period ===
What might neutrally be called "sufflation" is found in some of the earliest liturgies dealing with the protracted process of initiation known as the "catechumenate," which saw its heyday in the 4th and 5th centuries. The earliest extant liturgical use is possibly that of the Apostolic Tradition attributed to Hippolytus of Rome, from the 3rd or 4th century, and therefore contemporary with Cyril in the east:

Those who are to be baptized should … be gathered in one place. … And [the bishop] should lay his hands on them and exorcize all alien spirits, that they may flee out of them and never return into them. And when he has finished exorcizing them, he shall breathe on their faces; and when he has signed their foreheads, ears, and noses, he shall raise them up.

=== Distribution, geographical and functional ===
The practice entered the baptismal liturgy proper only as the catechumenate, rendered vestigial by the growth of routine infant baptism, was absorbed into the rite of baptism. Both exsufflation and insufflation are well established by the time of Augustine and in later centuries are found widely. By the Western high Middle Ages of the 12th century, sufflation was geographically widespread, and had been applied not only to sufflating catechumens and baptizands, but also to exorcism of readmitted heretics; to admission of adult converts to the catechumenate; to renunciation of the devil on the part of catechumens; to consecration and/or exorcism of the baptismal font and water; to consecration or exorcism of ashes; and to the consecration of the chrism or holy oil.

=== Medieval period ===
Most of these variations persist in one branch or another of the hybrid Romano-Germanic rite that can be traced from 5th-century Rome through the western Middle Ages to the Council of Trent, and beyond that into modern (Tridentine) Roman Catholicism. As the 'national' rites such as the Ambrosian tradition in northern Italy and the Spanish Mozarabic rite faded away or were absorbed into international practice, it was this hybrid Roman-Gallican standard that came to dominate western Christendom, including Anglo-Saxon and medieval England, from the time of Charlemagne, and partly through his doing, through the high and late Middle Ages and into the modern period. Roman practice around the year 500 is reflected in a letter by a somewhat mysterious John the Deacon to a correspondent named Senarius. The letter discusses the exsufflation of catechumens at length. The Stowe Missal, Irish in origin but largely Gallican in form, contains a prebaptismal sufflation of unclear significance. The other Gallican rites are largely devoid of sufflation, though the so-called Missale Gothicum contains a triple exsufflation of baptismal water, and a prebaptismal insufflation of catechumens is found in the hybrid Bobbio Missal and the 10th-century Fulda sacramentary, alongside the more common baptismal exsufflation. The 11th-century North-Italian baptismal ritual in the Ambrosian Library MS. T.27.Sup. makes heavy use of the practice, requiring both insufflation and triple exsufflation of the baptismal candidates in modum crucis, and insufflation of the font as well. The "Hadrianum" version of the Gregorian Sacramentary, sent to Charlemagne from Rome and augmented probably by Benedict of Aniane, contains an insufflation of the baptismal font, as does the mid-10th-century Ordo Romanus L, the basis of the later Roman pontifical. Ordo Romanus L also contains a triple exsufflation of the candidates for baptism, immediately preceding the baptism itself.

Most of the numerous Carolingian expositions of baptism treat sufflation to some extent. One anonymous 9th-century catechism is unusual in distinguishing explicitly between the exsufflation of catechumens and the insufflation of baptismal water, but most of the tracts and florilegia, when they treat both, do so without referring one to the other; most confine themselves to exsufflation and are usually content to quote extracts from authorities, especially Isidore and Alcuin. Particularly popular was Isidore's lapidary remark in the Etymologies to the effect that it is not the human being ("God's creature") that is exsufflated, but the Prince of Sinners to whom that person is subjected by being born in sin, a remark that echoed Augustine's arguments against the Pelagians to the effect that it was not the human infant (God's image) that was attacked in sufflation, but the infant's possessor, the devil. Particularly influential was Alcuin's brief treatment of the subject, the so-called Primo paganus, which in turn depended heavily on John the Deacon. The Primo paganus formed the basis of Charlemagne's famous circular questionnaire on baptism, part of his effort to harmonize liturgical practice across his empire; and many of the seventeen extant direct or indirect responses to the questionnaire echo Alcuin, making the process a little circular and the texts a little repetitious. The burden of Alcuin's remarks, in fact, appears above in the quotation from the Libellus of Magnus of Sens, one of the respondents. The questionnaire assumed that exsufflation of or on the part of the candidate for baptism was generally practiced — it merely asks what meaning is attached to the practice:

"Concerning the renunciation of Satan and all his works and pomps, what is the renunciation? and what are the works of the devil and his pomps? why is he breathed upon? (cur exsufflatur?) why is he exorcised?"

Most of the respondents answered that it was so that, with the devil sent fleeing, the entry of the Holy Spirit might be prepared for.

==== In England ====
On the other side of the Channel, in Anglo-Saxon England, sufflation is mentioned in Bishop Wulfstan's collection of Carolingian baptismal expositions, the Incipit de baptisma, and in the two vernacular (Old English) homilies based on it, the Quando volueris and the Sermo de baptismate. The Incipit de baptisma reads: "On his face let the sign of the cross be made by exsufflation, so that, the devil having been put to flight, entry for our Lord Christ might be prepared." Among English liturgical texts proper, the 10th-century Leofric Pontifical (and Sacramentary) dictates an insufflation of baptizands, a triple insufflation of the baptismal water, and an 'exhalation' of holy oil. In the 11th century, the Salisbury Pontifical (BL Cotton MS Tiberius C.1) and the Pontifical of Thomas of Canterbury require insufflation of the font; the Missal of Robert of Jumièges (Canterbury) has an erased rubric where it may have done likewise, as well as having an illegible rubric where it probably directed the exsufflation of catechumens, and retaining the old ordo ad caticuminum ex pagano faciendum, complete with its sufflation ceremony; and an English Ordo Romanus (BL Cotton MS Vitellius E.12) contains a triple exsufflation of baptizands. Various 12th-century texts include signing and triple exsufflation of the holy oil (Sarum), triple exsufflation of baptizands (the Ely, Magdalene, and Winton Pontificals), and insufflation of the font in modum crucis (Ely and Magdalene, followed by most later texts). Such are the origins of the late medieval sufflation rites, which were in turn retained in regularized form in post-Tridentine Catholicism.

=== Sufflation in Protestantism ===
Sufflation did not last long in any of the churches arising from the magisterial or radical reformations. Martin Luther's first attempt at a baptismal liturgy, the Tauffbuchlin (Taufbüchlein) of 1523 (reprinted 1524 and 1525) did retain many ceremonies from the late Medieval ritual as it was known in Germany, including a triple exsufflation of baptizands. But in an epilogue, Luther listed this ceremony among the adiaphora — i.e., the inessential features that added nothing to the meaning of the sacrament:

"The least importance attaches to these external things, namely breathing under the eyes, signing with the cross, placing salt in the mouth, putting spittle and clay on the ears and nose, anointing with oil the breast and shoulders, and signing the top of the head with chrism, vesting in the christening robe, and giving a burning candle into the hand, and whatever else … men have added to embellish baptism. For … they are not the kind of devices that the devil shuns."

The Lutheran Strasbourg Taufbüchlein of June 1524, composed by Diobald Schwartz, assistant to Cathedral preacher Martin Zell, on the basis of the medieval rite used in Strasbourg combined with elements of Luther's 1523 rite, also retains baptismal exsufflation; so does Andreas Osiander in Nuremberg, in the same year.

But thereafter the practice vanished from Lutheranism, and indeed from Protestantism generally. Luther's revised edition of 1526 and its successors omit exsufflation altogether, as do the Luther-influenced early reformed rites of England (Thomas Cranmer's Prayer Book of 1549) and Sweden (the Manual of Olavus Petri), despite the former's conservative basis in the medieval Sarum ritual and the latter's strong interest in exorcism as an essential part of the baptismal ritual.

Similarly in the Swiss Reformation (the Zwinglian/Reformed tradition), only the very earliest rites retain sufflation, namely the ceremony published by Leo Jud, pastor of St. Peter's in Zurich, in the same year (1523) as Luther's first baptismal manual.

=== Sufflation in Protestant-Roman Catholic debate ===
Though sufflation does not appear in Protestant practice, it definitely appears in Protestant polemic, where it is usually treated as an un-Scriptural and superstitious (i.e., in the Protestant view, a typically Roman Catholic) practice, and even one reeking of enchantment or witchcraft. It appears as such, for example in the work of Henry More (the 'Cambridge Platonist') on evil. His argument essentially reverses that of Augustine. Augustine had said to the Pelagians (to paraphrase): "you see that we exorcize and exsufflate infants before baptising them; therefore they must be tainted with sin and possessed by the devil since birth." More replies, in effect, "Infants cannot be devil-possessed sinners; therefore, ceremonial exorcism and exsufflation is presumptuous, frightening, and ridiculous," in a word "the most gross and fundamental Superstitions, that look like Magick or Sorcery":

"The conjuring the Devil also out of the Infant that is to be baptized would seem a frightful thing to the Infant himself, if he understood in what an ill plight the Priest supposes him, while he makes three Exsufflations upon his face, and uses an Exorcistical form for the ejecting of the foul Fiend. … And it is much if something might not appear affrightful to the Women in this approaching darkness. For though it be a gay thing for the Priest to be thought to have so much power over the Stygian Fiend, as to Exorcize him out of the Infant; yet it may be a sad consideration with some melancholick women laden with Superstition, to think they are never brought to bed, but they are delivered of a Devil and Child at once."

Sufflation appears in Roman Catholic anti-Protestant polemic, as well. The relative antiquity of the practice, and its strong endorsement by the Protestants' favorite Father, Augustine, made it a natural element in Catholic arguments that contrasted the Protestant with the ancient and Apostolic church. A true church, according to Roman Catholic apologists, would be:

"A Church that held the exorcismes exsufflations and renunciations, which are made in baptisme, for sacred Ceremonies, and of Apostolicall tradition.... A Church which in the Ceremonies of baptisme, vsed oyle, salte, waxe, lights, exorcismes, the signe of the Cross, the word Epheta and other thinges that accompanie it; to testifie ... by exorcismes, that baptisme puts vs out of the Diuells possession.

This was argued on the grounds that some of these ceremonies were demonstrably ancient, and all of them might be.

"Sundry Ceremonies vsed in baptisme, and other Sacraments, as Exorcismes, Exsufflations, Christening, and the like mentioned by S. Augustine and by diuers other ancient Fathers ..., these being practised by the Primitiue Church (which is graunted to be the true Church) and compared to the customes of Protestants, and vs, in our Churches, will easily disclose, which of the two, they or we, do more imitate, or impugne the true Church of antiquity."

To which a Protestant reply was that sufflation was not ancient enough, and could not be proved to be apostolic:

"It was plain then there was no clear Tradition in the Question, possibly there might be a custome in some Churches postnate to the times of the Apostles, but nothing that was obligatory, no Tradition Apostolicall. But this was a suppletory device ready at hand when ever they needed it; and S. Austin confuted the Pelagians, in the Question of Original sinne, by the custome of exorcisme and insufflation, which S. Austin said came from the Apostles by Tradition, which yet was then, and is now so impossible to be prov'd, that he that shall affirm it, shall gaine only the reputation of a bold man and a confident."

Sufflation was judged by Protestant critics to be irrational, mysterious, and obscure, an increasingly important factor by the close of the 17th century and the dawn of the Enlightenment:

"Mystery prevail'd very little in the first Hundred or Century of Years after Christ; but in the second and third, it began to establish it self by Ceremonies. To Baptism were then added the tasting of Milk and Honey, Anointing, the Sign of the Cross, a white Garment, &c. ... But in later times there was no end of Lights, Exorcisms, Exsufflations, and many other Extravagancies of Jewish, or Heathen Original ... for there is nothing like these in the Writings of the Apostles, but they are all plainly contain'd in the Books of the Gentiles, and was the Substance of their Worship."

It was said to be a human invention, imposed by the arbitrary whim of a tyrannical prelate against the primitive Gospel freedom of the church:

"[Some bishop] ... taking it into his head that there ought to be a trine-immersion in baptism; another the signation of the cross; another an unction with oil; another milk and honey, and imposition of hands immediately after it; another insufflation or breathing upon the person's face to exorcise the Devil... Thus, I say, that inundation of abominable corruptions, which at present overwhelms both the Greek and Romish Churches, gradually came in at this very breech which you are now zealously maintaining, namely, the Bishop's Power to decree rites and ceremonies in the Church."

To all of which, Roman Catholic apologists replied that insufflation was not only ancient and Apostolic, but had been practiced by Christ himself:

"When he [Christ] had said this he breathed upon them, and said to them, Receive the Holy Ghost...." When the Pastors of our Church use the Insufflation or Breathing upon any, for the like mystical Signification, you cry aloud, Superstition, Superstition, an apish mimical action, &c."

=== Prospects ===
Though liturgical sufflation is almost gone, at least from the Western churches, its revival is not inconceivable. Liturgical renewal movements always seem to look to the 'classic' catechumenate of the 4th and 5th centuries for inspiration. Insufflation has indeed been re-introduced into the Catholic "new catechumenate." But many ceremonies dating from that or the medieval period have been re-imported even into Protestant rites during the last couple of decades. Perhaps even more likely is a revival in the context of the growth of the Roman Catholic Church in Africa and in Asia, where locally and culturally meaningful ceremonies have often revolutionized practice, and where the exorcistic function of baptism has taken on a new vitality. For example, a pure insufflation is apparently practiced in the Philippine Independent Church, and Spinks mentions a pre-baptismal ceremony used by the Christian Workers' Fellowship of Sri Lanka, in which the candidates are struck with a cane and their faces are breathed upon. It is not clear whether the latter represents a revival of historical sufflation, or a wholly new ceremony derived from local custom.

== Significance and associations ==
There were at least three kinds of association that particularly influenced how liturgical sufflation came to be understood: Biblical antecedents; liturgical setting; and extra-liturgical (cultural) analogs.

=== Biblical antecedents ===
Three Biblical passages recur repeatedly with reference to insufflation narrowly defined, all of them referring to some kind of life-giving divine breath. The first and most commonly cited is Genesis 2:7 (echoed by Wisdom 15:11 and Job 33:4), in which God first creates man and then breathes into him the breath of life, in order to give him (as the passage was later interpreted) a human soul. The second passage, Ezekiel 37:9, reinterprets the Genesis passage prophetically, in foreseeing God resurrecting the dead bones of exiled Israel by means of his life-giving breath. And finally, in John 20:22, Christ is represented as conveying the Paraclete to his disciples, and so initiating the commissioned church, by breathing on them, here too, very possibly, with implicit reference to the original creation. The two passages were connected explicitly in later Christian exegesis: the same breath that created man re-created him.

"[Insufflation] signifies, To blow into, Gen. 2. 7. This sheweth mans soul not to be of the earth, as his body was, but of nothing, by the insufflation of God, and so differing from the spirit of beasts, Eccl. 3. 21. This word is used also, when Christ to make men new creatures, inspired his Apostles with the holy Ghost, Joh. 20. 21."

"The Lord God, saith the Text, formed man of the dust of the ground, and breathed into his Nostrils the breath of life, and man became a living Soul. His Body made of Earth, but his Soul the Breath of God. … We must not understand it grosly; for so Breath is not attributable unto God, who is a simple and perfect Spirit; but … as a figurative expression of God's communicating unto Man that inward Principle, whereby he lives and acts, not only in common with, but in a degree above other Animals. … The Learned P. Fagius takes notice of three things in the Text of Moses, which do conclude the Immortality of the Soul of Man. I. Insufflatio illa Dei: This Inspiration from God spoken of: For he that breaths into another, contributes unto him aliquid de suo somewhat of his own: And therefore, saith he, when our B. Saviour would communicate his Spirit to his Disciples, he did it with Insufflation, breathing on them, thereby to signifie, se Divinum & de suo quiddam illis contribuere [i.e., that he was himself divine and was infusing something of his own into them]."

The associations with creation, rebirth, initiation, and revivification created by these passages of Scripture suited insufflation for a role in baptism as it has been most commonly regarded: as figuring the waters of creation (over which the Spirit brooded); as figuring the womb of rebirth; and as figuring (in Saint Paul's metaphor) the tomb, into which the Christian joins Christ in descending, and from which the Christian likewise joins Christ in ascending, dead to the old life but made alive again in Christ.

There are also Biblical antecedents for exsufflation, properly speaking, that is, exorcistic blowing, especially the numerous Old Testament passages in which "the breath of God" is the vehicle or symbol not of life but of death and destruction — an expression of the wrath of God: "by the breath of God they perish / and by the blast of his anger they are consumed" (Job 4:9, RSV). The same power is attributed metaphorically to Christ: "The lawless one will be revealed, and the Lord Jesus will slay him with the breath of his mouth" (2 Thessalonians 2:8, RSV). Even less obvious passages could be associated with liturgical exsufflation. Jesse of Amiens, for example, interprets Psalm 34 (Vulg. 35):5 as descriptive of the fate of exsufflated devils: ""Let them be like chaff before the wind, with the angel of the Lord driving them on!" And the apocryphal Acts of Thomas describes a baptismal ceremony which, though it does not explicitly contain a breathing ceremony, may imply one, "Let the gift come by which, breathing upon thine enemies, thou didst make them draw back and fall headlong, and let it dwell in this oil, over which we name thy holy name."

God's breath can be fiery, consuming all it touches: "I will blow upon you with the fire of my wrath" (Ezekiel 21:31, RSV). Some of the interpretations of exsufflation may reflect this. Cyril of Jerusalem, for example, when he discusses exsufflation in his catechetical sermons, interprets the liturgical practice in terms of fire:

"The breathing of the saints and the invocation of the name of God, like fiercest flame, scorch and drive out evil spirits."

Fire remains a theme in later liturgical exorcisms, for devils, as Nicetas is reported to have said, "are purged by exorcisms as by fire": "we come against you, devil, with spiritual words and fiery speech; we ignite the hiding places in which you are concealed."

=== Liturgical context ===
More importantly, perhaps, fire is physically and symbolically associated with sufflation because of the traditional placement of baptism within the Paschal vigil — a setting heavy with symbolism of light and fire: the blessing of the Paschal candle, the lighting of the "new fire," and the singing of the Exultet and the Lumen Christi. The intimate connection between divine breath and divine fire appears in its most visually arresting form during the benediction of the font, in which, according to most orders, the candle is dipped in the font while the priest declares the power of the Holy Spirit to have descended into the water: the sufflation of the font in most cases directly precedes or accompanies the immersion of the candle. Their close association can again be illustrated from Wulfstan's baptismal homilies:

"By the breath that the priest breathes into the font when he blesses it, the devil is straightway driven out from it. And when the priest dips the consecrated candle in the water, then that water forthwith becomes imbued with the Holy Ghost."

Similar considerations bind sufflation closely to imagery of light and darkness, specifically of the movement of the baptizand from the kingdom of darkness into the kingdom of light (a very common theme), and to the sign of the cross (a very common action), among others that could be mentioned. John the Deacon uses light-dark imagery to explain exsufflation in exorcism as a transition:

The exsufflated person is exorcised so that ... having been delivered from the power of darkness, he might be translated into the kingdom ... of God.

So also Augustine ("The church exsufflates and exorcises [infants] that the power of darkness might be cast out from them"), and Isidore ("The power of the devil is ... exsufflated in them, so that ... being delivered from the power of darkness, [they] might be translated unto the kingdom of their Lord").

And as regards signation (the sign of the cross), in Western texts from as early as the Gelasian Sacramentary, the one gesture almost always precedes (or precedes and follows) the other, and their significance is often complementary if not identical. In Raban Maur's discussion of the baptismal liturgy, for example, the exsufflation is said to expel the devil, the signing to keep him from coming back. The two signs are frequently combined, the blowing done in the form of a cross, e.g. in the Syriac Rite described by James of Edessa, in the modern Coptic rite, in the late 9th-century Ordo Romanus XXXI, in Wulfstan's Anglo-Saxon homilies and their Continental sources, in the 10th-century Ambrosian rites for catechumen and font, in the 11th-century North Italian catechumenal rites, in the 12th- through 15th-century English pontificals, in the Sarum Missal, and in the 13th-century Roman pontifical.

== Extra-liturgical (hagiographic and magical) use ==
=== Patristic period ===
There are hints in some of the Church Fathers that Christians had a habit of breathing (or hissing) at evil spirits as a recognized act of revulsion or repulsion, even apart from the ceremonies of the church. Tertullian is perhaps the best witness. He seems to be talking about an extra-liturgical casting out of demons by means of exsufflation and signing when he declares that gods rejected by Christians are driven from the bodies of men "by our touch and by our breath," and are thus "carried away by the thought and vision of the fire [of judgment]." He is talking about an ordinary gesture of aversion when he asks a Christian incense-dealer (regarded as hypocritical because he sells incense for polytheistic altars), "with what mouth, I ask, will he spit and blow before the fuming altars for which he himself provided? with what constancy will he [thus] exorcise his foster children?" And his remarks to his wife about the dangers of mixed marriage suggest that exsufflation was a distinctively Christian practice: "[If you marry again, to a non-Christian,] shall you escape notice when you sign your bed or your body? when you blow away some impurity? When even by night you rise to pray?"

If such a custom did exist, it would clarify certain remarks by other Fathers, which might otherwise seem merely metaphorical. Eusebius, for example, says of the saints that they were men "who though they only breathed and spoke, were able to scatter the counsels of evil demons." Irenaeus describes the right response to Gnostic doctrine as "reviling" (καταφυσησαντας; literally exsufflantes). Cyril of Jerusalem, speaking of resisting temptation, not of baptism, says that "the mere breathing of the exorcist becomes as a fire to that unseen foe." And Augustine's remarks about blowing on images of the emperor suggest that the significance of the gesture was well enough established to be actionable: "Of the great crime of lese majesty ... is he held guilty, according to the laws of this world, who blows upon an image ... of the emperor." Even as late as Bede, we may suspect that "exsufflate" in the sense of "revile" or "cast off" may be a living metaphor.

== Hagiography ==
The extremely influential Life of Saint Martin by Sulpicius Severus seems to have set in motion a hagiographic tradition in which saints cast out demons or repel tempting devils by blowing at them. Of Saint Pachomius, for example, it is said that "defending his brow with the sign of the cross, he blew upon [the demon] and immediately he fled … ; blowing upon him, he said, 'depart from me, devil.'" And of Saint Goswin that "a demon stood before Saint Goswin saying 'surely you see that I am Christ …' and … therefore Saint Goswin exsufflated vigorously, saying 'depart foe …,' and immediately … the devil vanished." Saint Justina is reported to have similarly unmasked a series of increasingly subtle and powerful demons, finally melting the prince of demons himself: "blowing upon the devil, she immediately melted him like wax and … felt herself freed from all temptation." And Saint Felix is said to have destroyed idols and uprooted sacred trees by like means.

The breath of the saints was credited with healing, as well as exorcistic, powers from an early period. Gregory of Nyssa says of Gregory Thaumaturgus ('Gregory the magician') that he needed to resort to "no finicking and laborious" magic, but "there sufficed, for both the casting out of demons and the healing of bodily ailments, the breath of his mouth." Similar powers are attributed to the Irish saints: kindling lamps, curing dumbness. This theme, too, persists in later hagiographic and quasi-hagiographic texts, appearing, for example in the Estoire del saint graal as the agency by which a madman is miraculously restored. Among English texts, Felix's Life of Saint Guthlac relates that in order to give relief to a boy afflicted by madness, he "washed him in the water of the sacred font and, breathing into his face the breath of healing [or 'spirit of salvation'], drove away from him all the power of the evil spirit," illustrating the difficulty of distinguishing healing from exorcism in an era in which madness was attributed to demonic possession. The miracle that Bishop John performed, according to Bede, on behalf of Herebald, is another example, since it involved a sufflation that was seemingly exorcistic, catechetical, and curative simultaneously.

== Magic and folk medicine ==
Tertullian remarked to his wife about Christian practices: "will you not seem to be doing magic?" in the eyes of a non-believer.

Celsus (according to Origen) reports the use of exsufflation by Egyptian magicians. Plotinus seems to attack its use by Roman ones. One of Lucian's tall tales mentions a Chaldean pest-control sorcerer who causes toads and snakes to vanish by blowing on them.

In Syria, where ceremonial breathing became formalized as part of the rite of visitation of the sick, Ephraem Syrus advises that "if medicine fails you when you are sick, the 'visitors' will help, will pray for health, and one of them will breathe in your mouth, the other will sign you [with the sign of the cross]."

If it was either originally Christian or from the pagan practices, almost similar methods of healing have been reported, continuing until modern times: in Westphalia, the healing of a wound by triple signing and triple cruciform sufflation, or by exsufflation accompanied by a rhyming charm; and in Holland the alleviation of toothache by similar means. According to Drechsler, "Illnesses were blown away by the breath. If a child had bumped himself, one would blow three times on the place and it would 'fly away.'" Burns, and conditions that in some fashion resemble burns, such as fevers, boils, sore throats and rashes, are naturally the most common objects of blowing among modern folk-remedies, for example the Shetland cure that requires blowing on a burn three times while reciting the charm "Here come I to cure a burnt sore. / If the dead knew what the living endure, / The burnt sore would burn no more." But everything from jaundice, convulsions, and colic to bad luck and evil spells can apparently be alleviated by a bit of blowing. Wolters points out that exorcistic blowing was still (in 1935) found in the custom of blowing over bread that is about to be eaten. Moreover,

A Syrian blows over his child to avert the evil eye. Some still
blow three times over a strange spoon before using it, and in Alaska the medicine
man blows into the nose and mouth of a patient to drive out the daemon of disease.

In one American example of superstition clearly derived from liturgical use, it is said that if at the baptism of a baby one turns at the door and blows three times, one can successfully prevent the devil from ever coming between the baby and the altar.

== See also ==
- Hanānā
