= Šulak =

Babylonian demon

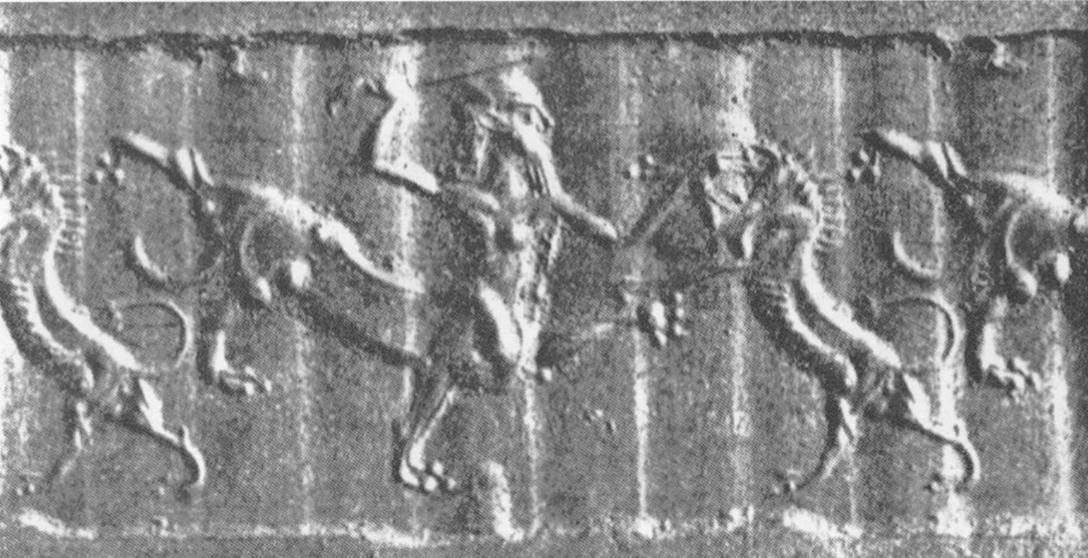
- Šulak (right) depicted battling the lion-centaur Urmahlullu (left) on a Middle Assyrian cylinder seal
- Other names: Lurker; Hitter; Upholder-of-Evil
- Akkadian: 𒀭𒋗𒋃, ^{d}šu-lak
- Abode: Toilets
- Enemy: Urmahlullu

Equivalents
- Jewish: Bar Širiqa

In ancient Babylonian medicine and religion, Šulak (Akkadian: 𒀭𒋗𒋃, ^{d}šu-lak, or 𒀭𒋗𒆷𒀝, ^{d}šu-la-ak) was a demon that lived within toilets. It was believed by Babylonians and Assyrians to attack those who sat on toilets while they defecated, striking them or possessing them and inflicting maladies such as stroke and epilepsy. Šulak was described as resembling a bipedal lion, and Babylonians invoked the lion-centaur spirit Urmahlullu to ward off the demon. A similar demon, Bar Širiqa, appears in the Babylonian Talmud and has been theorized to derive from Babylonian beliefs surrounding Šulak.

== Background ==
The ancient Babylonians viewed medicine as a form of magic. Diseases were diagnosed as being caused by supernatural means, typically by a god or demon. Babylonian medical texts provided information about symptoms to diagnose various illnesses and their prognoses.

The name of Šulak is derived from a phrase meaning "dirty hands", due to its dwelling in the bīt musâti (𒂍 𒈬𒊓𒀀𒋾, E₂ mu-sa-a-ti), or "house of rinse-water", i.e. lavatory. Šulak is described in Akkadian sources as a lion that stands upright like a human. A Neo-Assyrian composition, retelling a dream by an Assyrian prince, states that "Šulak is a normal lion standing on its hind legs". Babylonian texts suggest that the demon could jump out of toilets to strike people as they defecated but could also leap into them and possess them.

== In Babylonian medicine ==
The Babylonians and Assyrians believed that Šulak was responsible for various maladies, including stroke (𒈪𒋃𒌓, mi-šit-tu₂, mišittu) and epilepsy. The phrases qāt Šulak (𒋗 𒀭𒋗𒋃, ŠU ^{d}šu-lak, 'hand of Šulak') and Šulak iṣṣabassu ('Šulak has possessed him') appear in several Babylonian diagnostic omen-apodoses. The connection between strokes and Šulak may have arisen due to fears that excessive strain on the toilet could cause such maladies. One Babylonian diagnostic text states that "[i]f the patient's left side hangs limp: that means the Hand of Šulak", and that "[i]f the whole left side of his body hangs limp [...] An exorcist cannot make a prognosis for his recovery or diagnosis for his cure".

Protective amulets in the form of the lion-centaur Urmahlullu, or cuneiform tablets inscribed with spells to ward off Šulak, were often buried in the doorways of lavatories, or in the foundations of the house, or deposited in drainage pipes. A Babylonian prescriptive text instructs readers to create clay figures of the lion-centaur and inscribe "You shall bar the way for the Upholder-of-Evil" on the sides of the figures before burying them at the doorways to lavatories. There are two known published spells to ward off Šulak. In one, it is known by the epithet Ša munzêti (𒊭 𒈬𒌦𒍣𒂊𒋾, ša mu-un-ze-e-ti, an alternative form of Ša musâti, "the one from the house of rinse-water") and in another spell it is called "the one who struck a young man and took away his life". Šulak was also known by the epithet of "the Lurker" and it may have also been called "the Hitter".

== In the Talmud ==
In the Babylonian Talmud, there is a demon known as Bar Širiqa (Biblical Hebrew: בר שיריקא, romanized: bar širiqaʾ), also called the "privy demon" or "demon of the lavatory" (שֵׁד שֶׁל בֵּית הַכִּסֵּא, šēḏ šel bêṯ hak-kissēʾ). Gittin 70a states that "[a]fter coming back from the lavatory, one should wait (some time) before sexual intercourse, as the demon of the lavatory accompanies him. If he does not wait, the offspring will be epileptic." In a 2013 paper, Avigail Manekin-Bamberger, a historian at Tel Aviv University, drew comparisons between Bar Širiqa and Šulak. She stated that both demons are said to dwell within toilets, both are said to cause epilepsy, strokes, and falls, both are described as taking the form of a lion, and they have similar names. Manekin-Bamberger argued that the similarity between the entities is one of numerous examples of ancient near-Eastern beliefs being echoed in the Talmud. In the 2000 book Birth in Babylonia and the Bible, academic Marten Stol claimed that the Talmudic prescription for men to avoid sex after defecating is "the heritage of the Babylonians".

== See also ==
- Toilet god
- Unclean spirit
