= Michael W. Cuneo =

Canadian author

Michael W. Cuneo is a Canadian-born author who was professor of sociology and anthropology at Fordham University.

== Early life and education ==
Cuneo was born in 1953 or 1954 (age 71–72) in Canada.

He worked as a cab driver in Toronto, Ontario. His father had also been a cab driver.

Cuneo received his doctorate from the University of Toronto in the study of religion in 1988. His doctoral supervisor was Roger O’Toole.

He became a professor at Fordham University in New York City, and has subsequently retired.

== Bibliography ==
- Catholics Against the Church: Anti-Abortion Protest in Toronto, 1969-1985 (1989) ISBN 9780802027269
- The Sociology of Religion: An Organizational Bibliography (1990) ISBN 9780824025847
- with Anthony J. Blasi, The Smoke of Satan: Conservative and Traditionalist Dissent in Contemporary American Catholicism ISBN 9780801862656
- American Exorcism: Expelling Demons in the Land of Plenty (2001) ISBN 9780385501767
- Almost Midnight: An American Story of Murder and Redemption (2004) ISBN 9780767913423
- A Need to Kill: Confessions of a Teen Murderer (2011) ISBN 9780312381547
- One Last Kiss: The True Story of a Minister's Bodyguard, His Beautiful Mistress, and a Brutal Triple Homicide (2012) ISBN 9780312539726

== Personal life ==
He has four children.
