= Urmahlullu =

Mythological creature

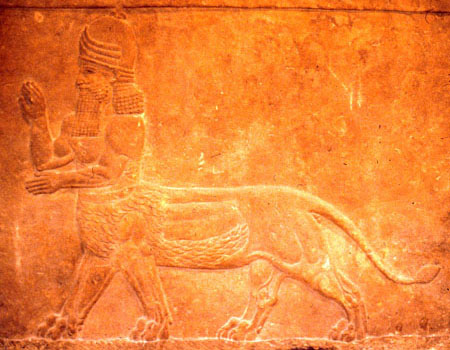

Creature information
- Grouping: Mythological hybrids
- Similar entities: Centaur
- Folklore: Mesopotamian

An urmahlullu (Sumerian language: 𒌨𒈤𒇽𒍇 ur-maḫ lu₂-lu₇) is a mythological lion-centaur hybrid creature. They are depicted in Mesopotamian art as quadrupedal felines from the waist down and humanoids from the waist up.

== Ancient Assyria and Mesopotamian culture ==
The urmahlullu ("untamed lion man") is a mythical ancient Mesopotamian beast with a lion-centaur appearance. It was sometimes depicted as holding a club and wearing a cap of divinity. A guardian spirit, its image was used to ward against various malign demons, including the winged death demon Mukīl rēš lemutti and the lavatory demon Šulak. Statues of Urmahlullu were sometimes placed outside lavatories, such as those in Nineveh's North Palace, or buried on either side of the lavatory door in homes wealthy enough to have lavatories on the premises.

Urmahlullu also appear on Assyrian cylinder seals.
