= Exsufflation =

Strongly forced expiration of air

Exsufflation is a strongly forced expiration of air.

In medicine, airway secretions can be cleared with manual and mechanical exsufflation. Mechanical insufflation-exsufflation devices (also known as In-Exsufflator, Cofflator, and cough machine) alternate positive and negative airway pressure to stimulate cough. It is typically used in patients with neuromuscular disorders and sleep apnea. After certain surgical procedures, the gases (such as carbon dioxide) used to expand body cavities are mechanically or manually exsufflated.

The term is also used for certain rituals in the Christian religion involving the blowing of air to remove evil spirits; these survive in Eastern Christianity, but between the sixteenth and twentieth centuries were progressively abandoned in the West. For details see Insufflation.

== See also ==
- Insufflation (medicine), Insufflation
