= Frank Hammond =

Author of Christian related books

Frank Davis Hammond
- Born: October 12, 1921; Terrell, Texas, United States
- Died: March 17, 2005 (aged 83); Plainview, Texas, United States
- Education: Baylor University; Southwestern Baptist Theological Seminary
- Spouse: Ida Mae Loden
- Writings: Pigs in the Parlor: A Practical Guide to Deliverance (1973)

Frank Davis Hammond (October 12, 1921 – March 17, 2005) was an American author of Christian books, particularly on deliverance ministry. In 1980 Hammond founded the Children's Bread Ministry with his wife (and sometimes coauthor) Ida Mae Hammond. Hammond was an alumnus of Baylor University and Southwestern Baptist Theological Seminary.

== Teachings ==
Hammond taught that ethical issues such as resentment and gossiping – together with issues such as compulsive eating, forgetfulness, sexual problems, and mental illness – may be caused by demons requiring deliverance ministry, and that such individuals may require such deliverance. He and his wife Ida Mae have been called "perhaps the most influential practitioners of deliverance ministry." Their 1973 book Pigs in the Parlor: A Practical Guide to Deliverance is one of the most influential on the topic, and has sold over a million copies.

Hammond's books helped to transfer the ideas of deliverance ministry into the Catholic Charismatic Renewal, in particular the concept of demonic influence short of the demonic possession that requires exorcism by a priest.

== Personal life ==
Hammond was born in Terrell, Texas, in October 1921. He married Ida Mae Loden (also of Terrell) in 1948.

== Bibliography ==
- Overcoming Rejection (1987)
- Soul Ties (1988)
- Confronting Familiar Spirits: Counterfeits to the Holy Spirit (1988)
- Promoted by God (1989)
- Our Warfare – Against Demons and Territorial Spirits (1991)
- Demons and Deliverance in the Ministry of Jesus (1991)
- Forgiving Others: The Key to Healing & Deliverance (1995)
- A Manual for Children's Deliverance (1996)
- Marriage Bed (1999)
- God Warns America (2000)
- The Tales of Two Franks: Unusual Deliverance Experiences (2000, with Frank Marzullo)
- The Father's Blessing (2001)
- Repercussions from Sexual Sins (2002)
- The Strongman of Unbelief (2002, with Dorman Duggan)
- The Perils of Passivity (2004)
- Saints at War (2012)

=== With Ida Mae Hammond ===
- Pigs in the Parlor: A Practical Guide to Deliverance (1973)
- Kingdom Living for the Family (1985)
- The Breaking of Curses (1993)
- Comfort for the Wounded Spirit (1994)

== See also ==
- Spiritual warfare
- Territorial spirit
