= Deliverance ministry =

Type of prayer used by some Christian groups

In Christianity, deliverance ministry refers to groups that perform practices to cleanse people of demons and evil spirits. These groups attribute people's physical, psychological, spiritual, and emotional problems to the activities of these evil spirits in their lives. Not all Christians accept the doctrines and practices of these ministries.

Deliverance is meant to cast out evil spirits (a.k.a. demons), helping people overcome negative influences, feelings, and experiences through the power of the Holy Spirit. Each event is different, but many include some or all of these significant steps: diagnosis, naming the demon, expulsion, and some form of action taken by the afflicted person after their deliverance to keep the demon from returning. The distinction between deliverance ministry and exorcism is that while exorcism focuses largely on possession and is for believers and unbelievers alike, deliverance focuses more on spiritual oppression and is more for believers. In both cases in casting out spirits, intercessors are following the example of Jesus Christ and his disciples given in the New Testament.

== History ==
=== Biblical precedent ===
Many believers in deliverance ministry cite Biblical precedent as an authoritative source for this practice; this forms a significant part in arguments surrounding deliverance practices. The Biblical precedent for freeing people of evil spirits returns to the authority that Jesus had and gave.

The New Testament mentions Jesus casting out evil spirits fifty-five times but only describes the events in detail five times. He casts demons out of a man in a synagogue (Mark 1) and two men near tombs (Matthew 8). In both episodes, Jesus converses with the demons, and they acknowledge him as the Son of God before he casts them out. This is a common occurrence in modern deliverance rituals as well. Jesus also casts demons out of a little girl (Mark 7) and a young boy (Luke 9), both events that the Bible expressly connects to strengthening the faith of their parents; modern practitioners of deliverance ministry interpret their experiences expelling demons as an opportunity to strengthen their own faith as well. Jesus heals a possessed man (Matthew 12) to show his Messianic calling and the fulfilment of prophecy, leading modern believers to see successful exorcisms as evidence of Jesus' power in their lives.

Jesus' disciples also cast out demons many times throughout the New Testament. This occurs before and after Jesus' death and resurrection. After his death and resurrection, believers interpret the events as proof of the authority the disciples still have through faith in Jesus. Each exorcism event is different in the Bible, and the methods used to cast out demons change; some participants in modern deliverance ministry interpret this to mean that there is no "right" or single way to cast out demons, but that many methods may be used as long as they are rooted in Christianity. Practitioners of deliverance ministry pay careful attention to each of these Biblical examples as they navigate and interpret demonic activity and deliverance rituals in their own lives.

However, it is worth noting that, even in the New Testament, there are reported cases where the disciples themselves were unable to cast out demons, having to resort directly to Jesus, or even others, who were not direct followers of Jesus, failed when trying to cast out demons by invoking His name. There is also the reminder that, even those who say they are capable of casting out demons in the name of Jesus, will be repudiated by Him on the Last Judgment, for not having been able to faithfully fulfill His word.

=== Post-Biblical deliverance practices ===
Exorcism was practiced by Catholics throughout the Middle Ages. Martin Luther practiced it in Germany during the 1500s as a way of participating in the "war with the devil," a tradition continued by Lutherans throughout the Reformation to the present day. He simplified the ceremony to avoid drawing attention to evil powers. Deliverance practices became somewhat more widespread with the growth of the Pentecostal movement, and especially with the Charismatic movement that began in the 1960s. These movements continue to understand themselves as part of spiritual warfare, in which Christians are understood to be at war with the forces of evil which work in the world in efficient ways, afflicting people with all kinds of problems (physical, emotional, spiritual). People believe they can combat these evil forces through the power and authority of God.

== Sources of demonic presence ==
According to believers in oppression, demons are believed to be able to enter a person's life in many different ways. Some believe that objects, by their very nature, harbor demons; for example, certain types of literature, especially if it leads the reader to question their faith and other media such as fantasy/horror novels or films, Dungeons and Dragons or other types of role-playing games, CD recordings of alleged satanic music, art with non-religious or blasphemous/sinful themes, or artifacts depicting pagan gods. Sacred texts (false religious texts) or simple decorations from a non-Christian religion may also be a hiding place for demons. Other types are objects with a sinful history (e.g. a piece of jewelry from an adulterous relationship, an object purchased with greed, etc.).

Demons can also be said to "run in families." The usual cause is ancestors who were Satanists, Freemasons, or witches, or who died unrepentant of terrible sins such as abuse, adultery, or murder. Some claim that negative traits and practices run in families because of the demonic presence that is passed down from parent to child. Others claim that physical ailments and persistent problems such as poverty and addictive behaviors (drugs, pornography, etc.) can be caused by ancestral sin and the resulting family curses.

== Methods ==
=== Diagnosis ===
Deliverance ministries focus on casting out the spirit or spirits believed to cause an affliction. The person must first be "diagnosed" with the presence/possession of an evil spirit, which often requires the participation of a person who is trained or experienced in this area. This expert may ask questions to learn about the person's life and try to discover if they have committed any sins that might invite a demonic presence; if they have, they must repent of that sin as part of the deliverance process. The expert might question the person about their relationships with their spouse, children, and friends, as poor relationships with closer circle may be evidence of a demonic presence. They may also ask about their extended family and ancestors to determine if the demon might be the result of a family curse. They can attempt to discern if an object or a room is the source of the demonic activity and help the person understand what may have attached the demon to that object or space. Some may be able to see demons or hear their names through the Holy Spirit. Once the source of the demonic presence is identified, it is cast out through the renouncing of any contract made with the spirit and any lies accepted, and commanded to leave by the power of the Holy Spirit.

Some believe that an ordained member of a clergy must perform the deliverance, while others believe that anyone can have that spiritual power. Diagnosis may occur in private spaces, or during public meetings as the Holy Spirit is invited to reveal the presence of demons in the attendees or while the "preacher" walks through the audience forcing demons to manifest themselves in the audience.

=== Naming the demon ===
Revealing the demon's name may be part of the expulsion process, as it gives the person casting out the demon authority over it. This process is not required to cast out the demon, and some adherents do not accept it (some believe that demons can give the wrong name). Still, others believe it is necessary. The presence may identify itself or be identified as a specific demon (e.g. Jezebel, Asherah, Baal, etc.) or its "name" might be the name of the sin or affliction it represents (e.g. rebellion, gluttony, sexual perversion, anorexia nervosa). Explicitly identifying the problem may prepare the healed preacher and the healed person to expel the demon.

=== Expulsion of demons ===
Various methods are used to expel demons. Some adherents recite Biblical verses about casting out demons, or pray; many also invoke "the blood of Jesus," a reference to Jesus suffering for people's sins and intervening with God on behalf of humanity. In this context, invoking the blood of Jesus is calling on him to intervene specifically on behalf of the possessed individual. The person performing the deliverance might touch the possessed person, or anoint them with oil or water. People may also perform rituals over objects that contain evil spirits, destroy them by breaking or burning them, then remove them from the home. If a place has evil spirits because of sins committed there in the past, people may repent on behalf of those who committed the sins as part of casting out the evil spirits. This is meant to force a demon to leave an afflicted person, place, or thing. The demon may resist the expulsion using the body of the possessed person and may speak, scream, cry, laugh, vomit, or lash out physically. exorcism or deliverance rituals can be loud, dramatic, and highly emotional experiences for those involved. Once the demon is gone, people often feel like a weight or darkness has left them.

=== Post-deliverance maintenance ===
According to believers in deliverance, a demon may return after a successful deliverance meeting if proper precautions are not taken. To avoid this, a person must pray over their own being as well as their home for God's protection over them. Because the Holy Spirit is believed to be stronger than the demons, the person remains protected. If needed, the person may have to take other steps of action as well, such as removing certain media from their home and creating boundaries with certain individuals who may have "spread" the spirit(s) to them.

Certain Christian theologians have held that the wearing of a head covering by Christian females confers protection against fallen angels, which they teach is referenced in 1 Corinthians 11:3–10.

== Formal work of ministries ==
Ministries can organize the removal from homes of items that are believed to harbor demons. Members are instructed to burn items that are related to Idolatry, "demon drawing" symbols, and music that summons demons. Rev. Don Jeffrey, an exorcist in Arizona, states that any of these objects should be exorcised of evil spirits and blessed before burning them or sending them to the dump. For example, some believe that ouija boards can act like a gateway for the demonic and must be exorcised and blessed, as the gate must be closed before it is destroyed.

For some Christians, deliverance ministries are activities carried out by specialists such as Bishop Larry Gaiters, Rev Miguel Bustillos, and Rev Vincent Bauhaus, or groups aimed at solving problems related to demons and spirits, especially possession of the body and soul, but not the spirit. Ministries like Ellel Ministries International, Don Dickerman Ministries, and Neil T. Anderson explicitly teach that a Christian cannot have demons in their spirit because the Holy Spirit lives there. However, they can have demons in their body or soul due to inner emotional wounds, sexual abuse, or Satanic ritual abuse. This is usually known as partial possession or demonic infestation, as opposed to outside demonic oppression which does not reside in any of the three parts of a person: body, soul, spirit.

== Deliverance vs. exorcism ==
While some people interchange the terms "exorcism" and "deliverance," others distinguish between the two. According to the latter school of thought, exorcisms are carried out through the use of various rituals of exorcism, such as those in the Roman Ritual, and often utilize attendant sacramentals such as holy water. In contrast, deliverance is not as ritualistic and may look different from meeting to meeting depending on the level of oppression, and how the Holy Spirit guides the meeting. (For example, while one may have to take some time to forgive others, another might not have any one to have to forgive, and may have to spend more time renouncing lies.) Others claim that "deliverance" and "exorcism" refer to the same practice but that exorcism is a more intense form and is used in more complex or extreme cases. Deliverance ministries seek to discern the influences that are more subtlety spiritual, and if needed, discern the root of them, whether it be from another or self-introduced. The individual must take responsibility and be involved in the process.

Some deliverance ministers do use crucifixes, holy water, and anointing oils, as well as the Bible. Some deliverance ministers who also use the term "exorcist" wear the clerical collar (first used by Presbyterians) and also incorporate a stole.

== Prominent figures ==
Frank Hammond and his wife Ida Mae have been called "perhaps the most influential practitioners of deliverance ministry." Their book Pigs in the Parlor: A Practical Guide to Deliverance, published in 1973, is one of the most influential books on the topic, and has sold over a million copies. In diagnosing demonic presence, they focused more on the moral, ethical, and spiritual signs of possession rather than more dramatic physical manifestations like writhing on the ground. As the title indicates, their book takes less of a theoretical/theological approach to deliverance; it's meant to be used by believers in real-life situations and includes tools like seven signs of demonic possession and how to recognize when a demon has departed following a ritual.

Reverend Bob Larson has also achieved widespread public notoriety, not just within the deliverance ministry movement itself. Larson is known for drawing media attention to deliverance practices; he performs exorcisms in front of live audiences, teaches exorcism workshops, and even had his own reality TV show, bringing a sort of theatrical quality to exorcism. His daughter Brynne and her friends Tess and Savannah were featured on news channels in 2012 under the title "the teenage exorcists," even gaining the attention of news organizations and publications as well known as BBC News and People magazine.

== See also ==
- Demonic possession
- Generational curses
- Exorcism in Christianity
- Spiritual warfare
- Charismatic movement
- Johann Blumhardt
