= Flood prayer =

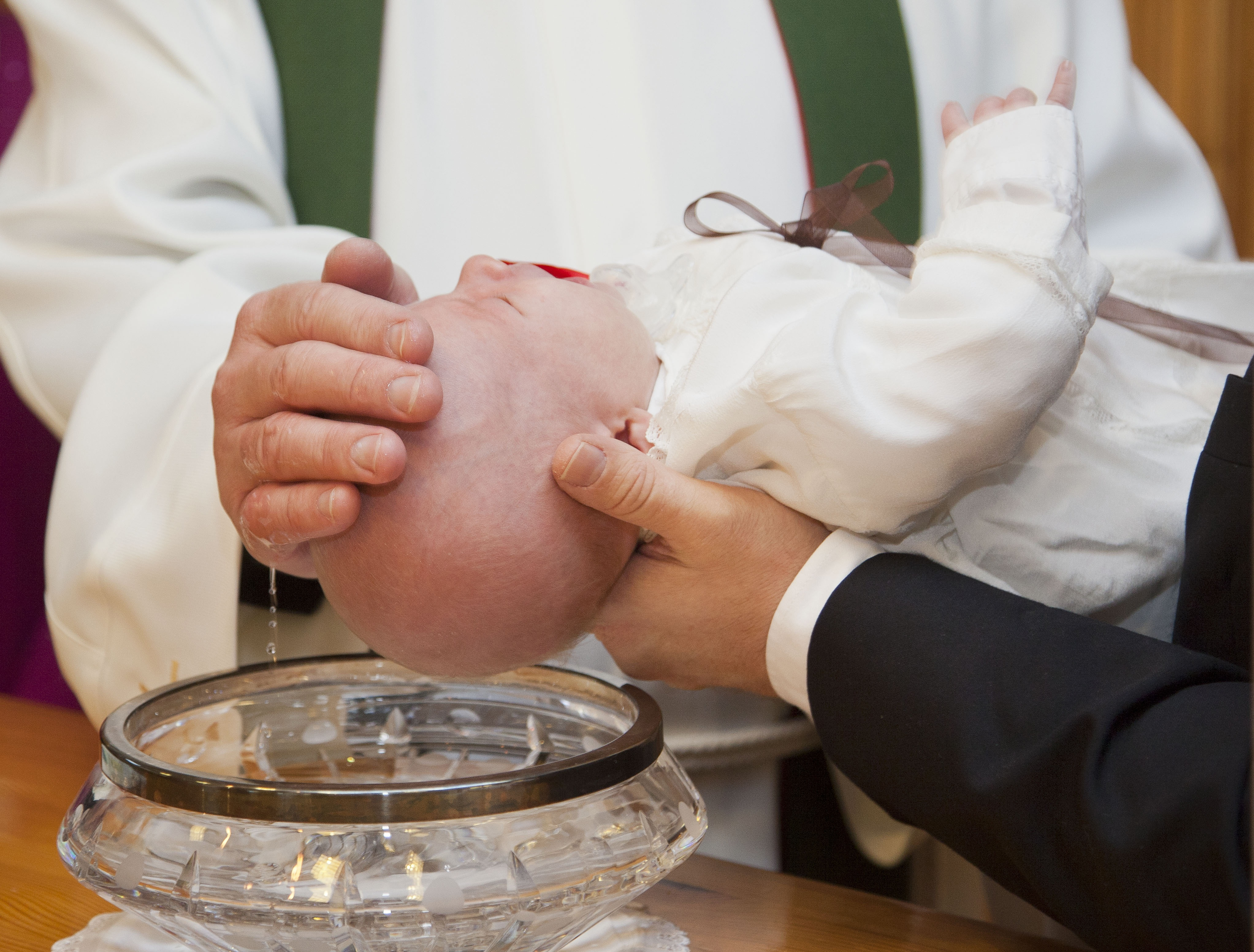
An infant being baptized in a Lutheran church.

The flood prayer (German: Sindflutgebet) is a prayer written by Martin Luther in 1523 and attached to the baptismal liturgy.

== Background ==
In 1523, Luther translated the Roman baptismal rite from Latin to German and in so doing he extensively revised it. Most of the revisions involved omitting material, but he also added the flood prayer to the service. This was included in his "Baptismal Booklet" (German: Taufbüchlein).

While the prayer was traditionally regarded as Luther's own composition, "recent scholarship has asserted that it was more than likely a prayer translated and edited from a blessing of baptismal water in a yet-to-be identified medieval ritual at his disposal." Isidore of Seville and Rupert of Deutz have both been suggested as possible sources.

The flood prayer was adopted by the Continental Reformed churches. It was included in a modified form in the Book of Common Prayer of the Church of England in 1549 and continues to be used there under the "Public Baptism of Infants".

== Text ==
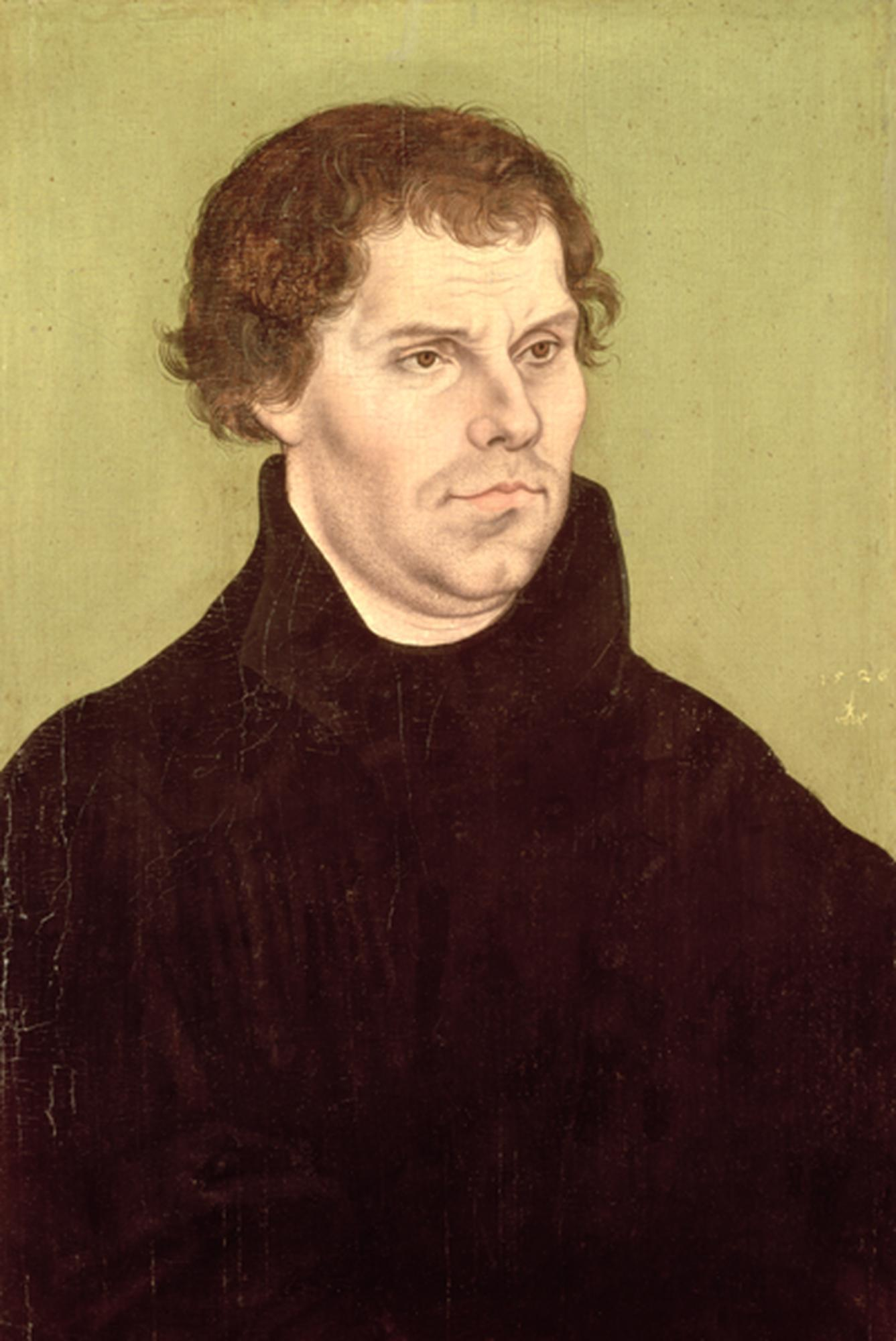
Lucas Cranach's 1526 portrait of Luther.

The text of the prayer as it found in the Lutheran Church – Missouri Synod's Lutheran Service Book goes as follows:

Almighty and eternal God, according to Your strict judgment You condemned the unbelieving world through the flood, yet according to Your great mercy You preserved believing Noah and his family, eight souls in all. You drowned hard-hearted Pharaoh and all his host in the Red Sea, yet led Your people Israel through the water on dry ground, prefiguring this washing of Your Holy Baptism. Through the Baptism in the Jordan of Your beloved Son, our Lord Jesus Christ, You sanctified and instituted all waters to be a blessed flood, and a lavish washing away of sin. We pray that You would behold (name) according to Your boundless mercy and bless him with true faith by the Holy Spirit that through this saving flood all sin in him which has been inherited from Adam and which he himself has committed since would be drowned and die. Grant that he be kept safe and secure in the holy ark of the Christian Church, being separated from the multitude of unbelievers and serving Your name at all times with a fervent spirit and a joyful hope, so that, with all believers in Your promise, he would be declared worthy of eternal life, through Jesus Christ, our Lord.

The Book of Common Prayer version removed the reference to Pharaoh but still kept the Red Sea and Noah's Ark:

Almighty and everlasting God, who of thy great mercy didst save Noah and his family in the ark from perishing by water; and also didst safely lead the children of Israel thy people through the Red Sea, figuring thereby thy holy Baptism; and by the Baptism of thy well-beloved Son Jesus Christ, in the river Jordan, didst sanctify Water to the mystical washing away of sin: We beseech thee, for thine infinite mercies, that thou wilt mercifully look upon this Child; wash him and sanctify him with the Holy Ghost; that he, being delivered from thy wrath, may be received into the ark of Christ's Church; and being stedfast in faith, joyful through hope, and rooted in charity, may so pass the waves of this troublesome world, that finally he may come to the land of everlasting life, there to reign with thee world without end, through Jesus Christ our Lord.

The Canadian Reformed Churches base only the first paragraph of their "Prayer Before Baptism" on the flood prayer":

Almighty, eternal God, in your righteous judgment you punished the unbelieving and unrepentant world with the flood, but in your great mercy saved and protected the believer Noah and his family. You drowned the obstinate Pharaoh and all his host in the Red Sea, but led your people Israel through the midst of the sea on dry ground—by which baptism was signified.

== Meaning ==
The prayer draws on 1 Peter 3:20-21: "...when God's patience waited in the days of Noah, while the ark was being prepared, in which a few, that is, eight persons, were brought safely through water. Baptism, which corresponds to this, now saves you..." (ESV). It also alludes to 1 Corinthians 10:2, which says that "our fathers... were baptized into Moses in the cloud and in the sea". The idea is that both the Red Sea and the water of Noah's Flood served a dual purpose of punishing the ungodly and saving the godly. Baptism is viewed therefore as a means of separating a person from the world. Zachary Purvis notes that anamnesis, "the remembrance of God’s mighty deeds in history," is employed to great effect.

The baptism then moves forward to the Baptism of Jesus; Mark Tranvik notes that "the prayer funnels this story of Jesus and John the baptizer from fifteen hundred years ago directly into the life of the one being baptized. He or she now stands through baptism as the recipient of the same saving flood."

Hughes Oliphant Old has noted that "Viewed in terms of biblical imagery, liturgical history, and pastoral sensitivity, Luther's prayer is a masterpiece."
