= List of exorcists =

An exorcist is a person who is believed to be able to cast out the devil or other demons. This list consists of notable people who have been known or been publicly recognized as performing exorcism

== Catholic exorcists ==
- Candido Amantini (1914–1992)
- Gabriele Amorth (1925–2016)
- Raymond J. Bishop (1906–1978)
- William S. Bowdern (1897–1983)
- Jeremy Davies (1935–2022)
- Joseph de Tonquedec (1868–1962)
- Thomas J. Euteneuer (1962)
- Angelo Fantoni (1903–1992)
- José Antonio Fortea (born 1968)
- Walter Halloran (1921–2005)
- Peter Heier (1895–1982)
- Edward Hughes (1918–1980)
- Pope John Paul II (1920–2005)
- Lawrence Kenny (1896–1977)
- Tadig Kozh (Placide Guillermic) (1788–1873)
- Vince Lampert (born 1963)
- James J. LeBar (1936–2008)
- Malachi Martin (1921–1999)
- Emmanuel Milingo (born 1930)
- Pio of Pietrelcina (1887–1968)
- Chad Ripperger (born 1964)
- Theophilus Riesinger (1868–1941)
- Peter Mary Rookey (1916–2014)

== Orthodox exorcists ==
- Avvákum Petróv (1621–1682)

== Anglican exorcists ==
- Martin Israel (1927-2007)
- Christopher Neil-Smith (1920–1995)
- Bill Subritzky (1925–2015)

== Lutheran exorcists ==
- Johann Blumhardt (1805–1880)

== Baptist, Evangelical, and Pentecostal exorcists ==
- Brian Connor (Baptist) (1946–2014), also taught people about spiritual warfare.
- Frank Hammond (Baptist) (1921–2005)
- Edir Macedo (Pentecostal) (born 1945)
- Derek Prince (Pentecostal) (1915–2003)
- Charles H. Kraft (Evangelical) (born 1932)
- Bob Larson (Evangelical) (born 1944)
