= Pazuzu (The Exorcist) =

Fictional character in The Exorcist horror novels and film series

- The Exorcist character
- Statue of Pazuzu as seen in The Exorcist film.
- First appearance: The Exorcist (1971 novel)
- Last appearance: The Exorcist (TV series)
- Created by: William Peter Blatty
- Based on: Pazuzu
- Portrayed by: Eileen Dietz (film); Robert Emmet Lunney (TV series)
- Voiced by: Mercedes McCambridge, Linda Blair and Ron Faber (The Exorcist); Colleen Dewhurst (III) Rupert Degas (The Beginning); Mary Beth Hurt (Dominion: Prequel to the Exorcist); Ian McKellen (2016 stage play); Alexandra Mathie (2014 BBC Radio play)

In-universe information
- Species: Demon
- Gender: Male

Pazuzu is a fictional character who is the main antagonist in The Exorcist horror novels and film series, created by William Peter Blatty. Blatty derived the character from Assyrian and Babylonian mythology, where the mythic Pazuzu was considered the king of the demons of the wind, and the son of the god Hanbi. In The Exorcist, Pazuzu appears as a demon who possesses Regan MacNeil.

Pazuzu is often depicted as a combination of animal and human parts with his right hand pointing upwards and his left hand downwards. He has the body of a man, the head of a lion or dog, eagle-like taloned feet, two pairs of wings, a scorpion's tail, and a serpentine penis.

== Appearances ==
=== Novels ===
Pazuzu first appeared in William Peter Blatty's 1971 novel The Exorcist. The novel is about a 12-year-old girl, Regan MacNeil, who becomes possessed by a demon. Although the demon is never explicitly stated to be the demon, the story includes two references were made about his statue, which was uncovered in the prologue by Father Lankester Merrin in northern Iraq. After Regan's mother worries about her daughter being possessed, Merrin and Karras arrive at her house and perform an exorcism on Regan and successfully force the demon out of Regan's head. In their struggle to save Regan from the thrall of Pazuzu, both priests perish.

Pazuzu returns in Legion, wanting to take revenge for being thrown out of Regan's head. He does this by driving the Gemini Killer's body into Father Damien Karras's dead one. Although not directly identified as Pazuzu, the Gemini Killer refers to "others" who would see his work continue. In the end of the novel, the Gemini Killer leaves the body of Father Karras following the death of the killer's father, the driving force behind the Gemini Killer's crimes.

=== Films ===
Two years after the novel was published, The Exorcist was released in theaters as a motion picture. In the beginning of the film, Father Merrin finds a ruined statue of the demon during an archaeological dig in Iraq. The majority of the film deals with Regan's demonic possession by a being she initially refers to as "Captain Howdy". During the attempted exorcism of Regan, the statue of Pazuzu that Merrin found at the beginning of the film briefly appears. The demon is ultimately exorcised from Regan's body after Merrin dies of a heart attack, and Father Damien Karras sacrifices himself by luring the demon into his body and then hurling himself through a window and down the now famous flight of stairs leading down to M Street NW, in Georgetown.

In Exorcist II: The Heretic, Pazuzu is named as the demon and returns to haunt Regan. There are flashbacks of Merrin battling the demon in Regan and also flashbacks of Merrin's exorcism of Pazuzu from a boy named Kokumo in Africa many years earlier. In the end of the film, Regan and Father Lamont, who has been trying to help her, but has become possessed by Pazuzu, return to Georgetown. After a struggle, he declines Pazuzu's offer of power and Regan banishes Pazuzu, appearing in the form of locusts.

The Exorcist III takes place 15 years after the original film. The film was adapted by Blatty from his novel Legion. Lieutenant Kinderman, who was also in the original film, has been on a murder case about mysterious deaths committed by an anonymous person. It is later found out that Pazuzu convinced the Gemini Killer, who died at the same time as Father Karras, to inhabit his body as punishment for saving Regan. However, as result of his suicide, his brain, which demons/spirits need when they possess a body, was severely damaged. The Gemini Killer spent years stimulating his brain so he would be of use, and then began committing murders by possessing the bodies of the other inhabitants of the hospital where Karras had been staying. In the end of the movie after a turbulent exorcism is done, Karras regains control of the body and asks Kinderman to kill him, which he does by shooting him in the head, keeping him from being possessed again.

In Exorcist: The Beginning and Dominion: Prequel to the Exorcist, Pazuzu is shown in his first encounter with Father Merrin in Africa in the duel that "nearly kills Merrin", referenced in the very first movie. Although the plot of both of these versions center around Merrin's African exorcism many years earlier, they take a sharp departure from the original scenes in Exorcist II: The Heretic where Merrin exorcises a young boy named Kokumo on a mountaintop. No effort was made to keep the stories consistent beyond that central idea.

=== Television ===
In The Exorcist television series, which is presented as a sequel to the original film, Pazuzu continues its pursuit of Regan and possesses her daughter Casey. After nearly killing Casey, the demon is able to possess Regan again and is almost able to take complete control of her mind. However, with the aid of the priest Father Tomas and her family, Regan fights back against Pazuzu, regaining control of her mind, just as Father Tomas exorcises the demon from her body.

== Concept and creation ==
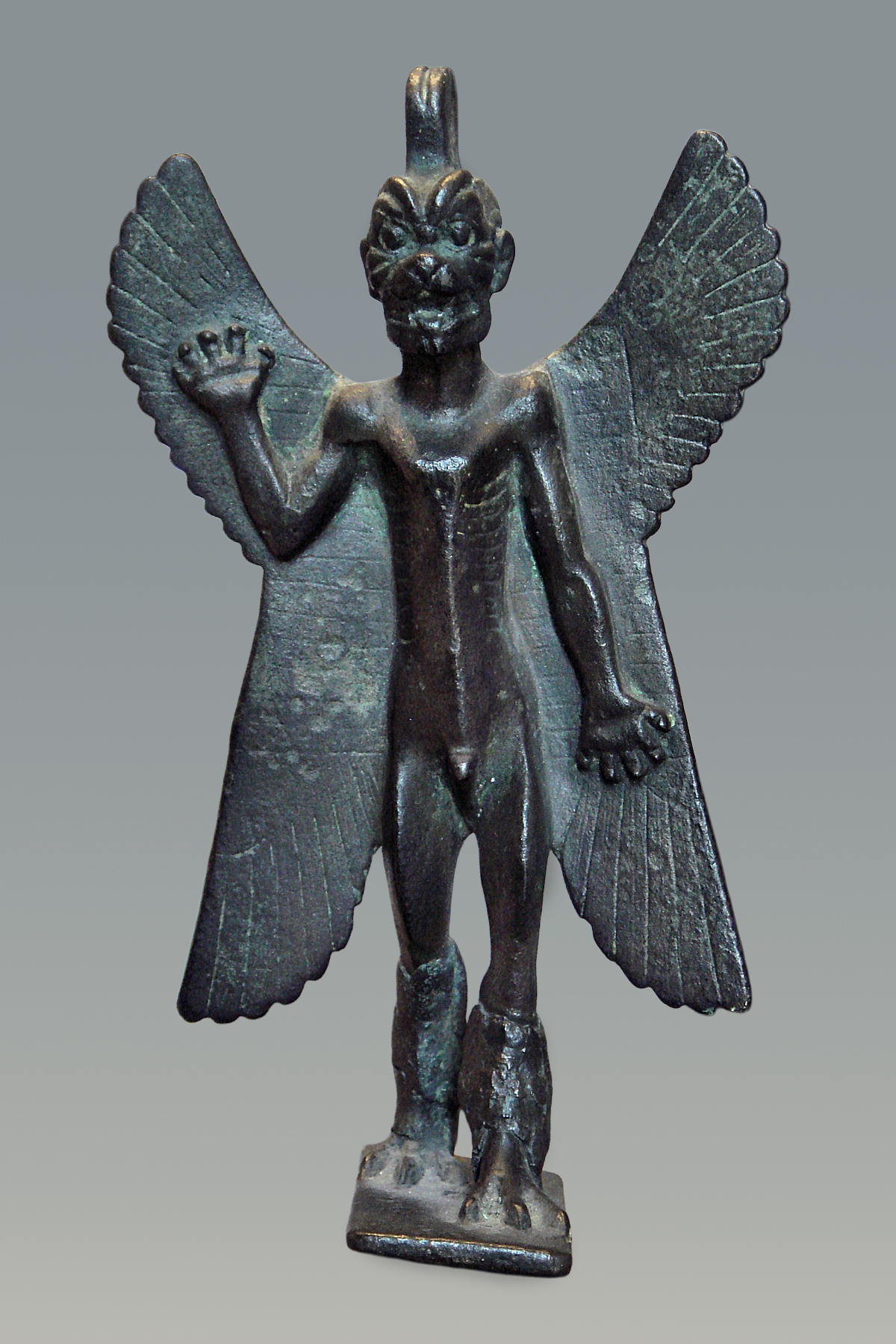
Assyrian demon Pazuzu, first millennium BCE

William Peter Blatty's creations of Pazuzu and The Exorcist were based on a heavily reported series of 1949 events in St. Louis, Missouri concerning the possession of a 14-year-old known as "Robbie Mannheim" (or sometimes "Roland Doe"). Blatty, who was a student at Georgetown University, read about the story in Washington, D.C. newspapers and created The Exorcist twenty years later.

Texas State religious studies professor Joseph Laycock believes that Blatty may have drawn his portrayal of Pazuzu from religion scholar Paul Carus's 1900 book The History of the Devil. It has an illustration of the statue of Pazuzu, the "demon of the southwest wind" in Chaldean tradition, which also has a loop through its head similar to the one Father Merrin finds on the amulet. Laycock speculates that Blatty may have acknowledged this source by giving his protagonist the similar-sounding name Karras and putting in his backstory that he had once written a paper on the Black Mass.

== Portrayal ==
In the first film, Linda Blair plays Regan. Mercedes McCambridge provides the majority of Pazuzu's dialogue, most notably in all the scenes with Fathers Karras and Merrin, although Linda Blair performs the voice in some early scenes, and Ron Faber in others. The demon mask used in the movie Onibaba (1964) inspired William Friedkin to use a similar design for the makeup in the shots. In these shots, the demon is played by actress Eileen Dietz, during the vomiting, levitation and masturbation scenes. Dietz underwent makeup tests for the "possessed Regan", wore one of the alternate make-ups in her role as the demon.

Pazuzu is mostly manifested by a swarm of locusts in Exorcist II: The Heretic, though is also shown possessing the young Regan and a young boy named Kokumo during flashback sequences.

The Exorcist III is the only film in which Pazuzu does not have a physical manifestation, though it still does have a few lines of dialogue, which are voiced by Colleen Dewhurst.

In Exorcist: The Beginning and Dominion: Prequel to the Exorcist, the victims possessed by Pazuzu are played by Izabella Scorupco and Billy Crawford respectively, and the voices of Pazuzu are Rupert Degas in the former film and Mary Beth Hurt in the latter.

In The Exorcist television series, Pazuzu in its natural form is portrayed by Robert Emmet Lunney. Its victims are an older Regan, portrayed by Geena Davis, and Regan's daughter Casey, portrayed by Hannah Kasulka.

== In popular culture ==
- Professional wrestler Danhausen has said his face make-up is based on Pazuzu from The Exorcist.
- Pazuzu has been featured in numerous spoofs/parodies. A notable example is Scary Movie 2, in which the scenes of the exorcism of Regan are spoofed in the prologue. The character was also spoofed in the film Repossessed; Linda Blair starred in the film and reprised her role as the demon.
- In the Highlander television series, the statue of Pazuzu is used during a storyline in which Duncan MacLeod duels a Satan-like being.
- A statue resembling Pazuzu appears in the Gorillaz's music video for "Rock It". Pazuzu is also depicted in the cover art of their 2007 compilation album D-Sides, designed by Jamie Hewlett. Band vocalist 2D is also sometimes depicted wearing a "Captain Howdy" T-shirt.
- A statue of Pazuzu appears in the Once Upon a Time episode "There's No Place Like Home", as one of the unpredictable artifacts in Rumplestilskin's vault.
- Pazuzu is the name of a gargoyle in the animated television series Futurama.
- In Beyond Wrestling, the current dominant heel stable is called Team Pazuzu.
- The original film was parodied in Saturday Night Live, season 1, episode 7, featuring guest host Richard Pryor as Father Karras.
- The statue was featured/parodied in the first segment of The Simpsons' 28th Treehouse of Horror episode. The episode, titled "The Exor-Sis", depicts Maggie Simpson becoming possessed by a replica of the statue. The episode aired on Fox on October 22, 2017.
- A statue of Pazuzu is also briefly shown in the Godzilla: King of the Monsters trailer and is seen for a split second before being blown away in a cave by an explosion.
- In Ridley Scott's movie Legend, the statue of Pazuzu from The Exorcist is visible as an atmospheric prop in two shots, and appears as a silhouette each time. Once in Meg Mucklebones' Swamp, and later in the long shot of the chained up Unicorn. It is recognizable as Pazuzu due to the distinctive wings.
- In the 1997 film, Wishmaster, a Pazuzu statue attacks guests at the party being held by the art collector, Beaumont (portrayed by veteran horror actor Robert Englund).
- In the 2010 sitcom Neighbors from Hell, Pazuzu is the name of the Hellmans' talking dog.
- Pazuzu is parodied in a 1990 episode of the BBC television sketch series, French and Saunders, titled "The Exorcist", in which Dawn French portrays Pazuzu/Regan, and Jennifer Saunders portrays Chris MacNeil.
- In the Canadian television series, SCTV, Catherine O'Hara features in a skit, as Pazuzu/Regan, titled "Exorcising with Reagan Blair".
- A picture of Pazuzu's face is used in the flash game Where's Waldo, a dark parody horror game on Newgrounds, where it is used as a famous Internet Screamer.
