= Thomas B. Allen (author) =

American author and historian

Thomas Benton Allen
- Born: March 20, 1929
- Died: December 11, 2018 (aged 89); Bethesda, Maryland
- Education: Bridgeport University
- Occupations: Author, Associate Chief Editor at National Geographic
- Spouse: Florence 'Scottie' MacBride
- Children: Christopher, Constance, and Roger

Thomas Benton Allen (March 20, 1929 – December 11, 2018) was an American author and historian. He resided in Bethesda, Maryland. He was also the father of science fiction writer Roger MacBride Allen. Allen was a contributing editor to National Geographic. Allen had co-authored numerous books with Norman Polmar. He had also written numerous mystery novels.

== Publication and film ==
His most famous book to date was Possessed. It is a retelling of the true story of a teenage boy (whom Allen identified by the pseudonym Robbie Manheim) from Mt. Rainier, Maryland, who went through the rite of exorcism in 1949. Allen tracked down the sole survivor of the team that performed the exorcism, Father Walter Halloran, as well as a copy of the diary kept by the team leader, Father William S. Bowdern. A diary authored by Father Raymond J. Bishop, S.J. is the primary source of documentation. Father Raymond J. Bishop, S.J enlisted the assistance of the other Jesuits. It was upon this case William Peter Blatty based the events of his novel, The Exorcist. First published in hardcover in 1993, the book was reïssued as a revised paperback in 2000 to coïncide with the release of a made-for-cable film Possessed starring Timothy Dalton as Father Bowdern. Since publication of the book, Allen had been a frequent guest on talk shows, entertainment shows, and history shows that discuss exorcism in general, demonic possession, and the case his book details.

Speaking in 2013, Allen "emphasized that definitive proof that the boy known only as 'Robbie' was possessed by malevolent spirits is unattainable. Maybe he instead suffered from mental illness or sexual abuse — or fabricated the entire experience." According to Allen, Halloran also "expressed his skepticism about potential paranormal events before his death."

== Criticism ==
Allen's Possessed has been criticized by Mark Opsasnick, who wrote that it contained questionable or inaccurate material, such as misidentifying the location as Mount Rainier, Maryland, rather than Cottage City, Maryland.

== Bibliography ==
- Rickover: Controversy and Genius: A Biography, 1982. with Norman Polmar
- Allen, Thomas B. War Games: The Secret World of the Creators, Players, and Policy Makers Rehearsing World War III Today. New York: McGraw-Hill, 1987. ISBN 0070011958
- Allen, Thomas B., and Sam Abell. The Blue and the Gray. [Washington, D.C.]: National Geographic Society, 1992. ISBN 0870448765
- Remember Pearl Harbor: Japanese And American Survivors Tell Their Stories
- Harriet Tubman, Secret Agent: How Daring Slaves and Free Blacks Spied for the Union During the Civil War
- Allen, Thomas B., F. Clifton Berry, and Norman Polmar. War in the Gulf. Atlanta: Turner Pub, 1991. ISBN 1878685015
- Possessed: The True Story of an Exorcism, 1993.
- Allen, Thomas B., and Norman Polmar. Code-Name Downfall: The Secret Plan to Invade Japan and Why Truman Dropped the Bomb. New York: Simon & Schuster, 1995. ISBN 0684804069
- Spy Book: The Encyclopedia of Espionage, 1996. with Norman Polmar
- The Shark Almanac: A Fully Illustrated Natural History of Sharks, Skates, and Rays, 1999.
- Allen, Thomas B., and Cheryl Harness. George Washington, Spymaster: How America Outspied the British and Won the Revolutionary War. Washington, D.C.: National Geographic, 2004. ISBN 9781417769261
- Dickson, Paul, and Thomas B. Allen. The Bonus Army: An American Epic. New York: Walker & Co, 2005. ISBN 0802714404
- Allen, Thomas B. Declassified: 50 Top-Secret Documents That Changed History. National Geographic Society, 2008. ISBN 9781426202223
- Mr. Lincoln's High Tech War (2008) with Roger MacBride Allen
- Time Capsule: The Book of Record (2010) with Roger MacBride Allen
- Allen, Thomas B., and Norman Polmar. Ship of Gold. Annapolis, Maryland : Naval Institute Press, 2014. ISBN 1591140722 Previously published in 1987 by Macmillan Publishing Company.
- Allen, Thomas B.1789: George Washington and the Founders Create America. Rowman & Littlefield Publishers, 2023. ISBN 9781538183090
