= Lankester Merrin =

Fictional character from the 1971 novel The Exorcist

- The Exorcist character
- Max von Sydow as Father Lankester Merrin in the 1973 film The Exorcist
- First appearance: The Exorcist
- Created by: William Peter Blatty
- Portrayed by: Films: Max von Sydow (The Exorcist and The Heretic); Stellan Skarsgård (The Beginning and Dominion); Stage plays: Richard Chamberlain; Peter Bowles; Paul Nicholas
- Voiced by: Ian McDiarmid (BBC Radio adaptation)

In-universe information
- Full name: Lankester Merrin
- Title: Father
- Occupation: Exorcist priest
- Nationality: Irish
- Location: Washington, D.C., United States

Father Lankester Merrin is a fictional character in the 1971 novel The Exorcist and one of the main protagonists in its 1973 film adaptation. He figures prominently in several of its prequel and sequel films. In addition to his role as a priest, Merrin is an accomplished archaeologist.

== In the novel ==
Merrin, an elderly Irish priest and paleontologist on an archeological dig in Iraq, finds images of the demon Pazuzu and subsequently experiences other unusual phenomena. He had previously faced the demon many years before during an exorcism in Africa. The find sparks a premonition that he will battle the demon again in a distant land. Merrin does not appear again until much later in the novel, when he joins the protagonist, Father Damien Karras, in Washington, D.C., to exorcise the demon from the body of a young girl (Regan MacNeil). Merrin, who has a heart disease for which he takes nitroglycerin, dies during the ritual, leaving the inexperienced Karras to complete the exorcism himself. Merrin is loosely based on the British archaeologist Gerald Lankester Harding, though in the film he is played by Max von Sydow with a noticeably Irish accent. This was later parodied by James Woods in the film Scary Movie 2.

== In the films ==
Stellan Skarsgård as Lankester Merrin in Exorcist: The Beginning (2004)

Merrin's depiction in the 1973 film The Exorcist is faithful to the novel. The character of Merrin reappears in the sequel Exorcist II: The Heretic (1977), in extended flashbacks detailing an exorcism he performed in Africa following the Second World War. He is portrayed in both films by Max von Sydow. The studio wanted Marlon Brando for the role of Father Merrin, but director William Friedkin immediately vetoed this by stating it would become a "Brando movie".

The character was featured again in both prequel films, Exorcist: The Beginning and Dominion: Prequel to the Exorcist. Both films revisit Merrin's experiences in Africa immediately prior to his first exorcism, but each presents a different version of the events and neither agrees with the events as presented in Exorcist II. Although initially planned to be Liam Neeson, he was finally played in both films by Stellan Skarsgård.

== Other adaptations ==
In the 2014 BBC Radio dramatisation, Merrin is voiced by Ian McDiarmid.

== See also ==
- Exorcism of Roland Doe
- Raymond J. Bishop
- William S. Bowdern
