= Possessed (2000 film) =

2000 American horror film

- DVD release cover
- Genre: Horror
- Based on: Possessed by Thomas B. Allen
- Screenplay by: Michael Lazarou; Steven E. de Souza
- Directed by: Steven E. de Souza
- Starring: Timothy Dalton; Henry Czerny; Piper Laurie; Christopher Plummer
- Music by: John Frizzell
- Country of origin: United States
- Original language: English

Production
- Executive producer: Barbara Title
- Cinematography: Edward J. Pei
- Editor: Anthony Redman
- Running time: 111 minutes
- Production company: MainTitle Pictures Regent Entertainment

Original release
- Network: Showtime
- Release: October 22, 2000

Possessed is a 2000 American horror television film directed by Steven E. de Souza, written by de Souza and Michael Lazarou, and starring Timothy Dalton. The film is based on events appearing in the 1993 book Possessed by Thomas B. Allen, which was inspired by the exorcism case of Roland Doe.

The film aired on Showtime on October 22, 2000, and was released on DVD in the United States on October 2, 2001.

== Plot summary ==
William S. Bowdern is a World War II veteran who was severely affected by a bad experience in France on All Saints' Day in 1944. In the first scene of the film, we flash-back through one of Bowdern's dreams to where he was trying to escape from a German advance as Schutzstaffel (SS) soldiers execute wounded American soldiers. A wounded soldier calls Bowdern, the chaplain, to give him the Last Rites; Bowdern at first denies him so he can escape. Bowdern rethinks the matter and does his duty but is bayonetted by an SS soldier. He becomes an alcoholic, tormented by his injuries and the guilt of refusing a dying man's last wish.

Years later, Bowdern is teaching his students at St. Louis University (SLU) when, at the end of the lecture, an angry mob breaks his classroom window with a brick. Outside, Bowdern discovers that there is a demonstration against the school's recent racial integration. When the police arrive, he asks them to arrest "those people" — meaning the protestors — but the police arrest the black students instead. Angered, Bowdern physically attacks the cops, who arrest him as well. Father Raymond McBride pays his bail, and drives him to the Alexian Brothers Hospital to show where the church places hopeless alcoholics and the mentally ill.

Robbie Mannheim is sitting with his aunt, Hanna, who is teaching him how to contact the "other world". Robbie's mother suddenly discovers the two at the ouija board. She scolds Aunt Hanna for disregarding her request that she must not expose Robbie to such ideas. Robbie disobeys his mother's demands that he stay away from the supernatural, as he enjoys the contacts.

When Aunt Hanna dies, Robbie continues trying to reach the other world. One day one of Robbie's classmates during school is severely wounded in the hand when a desk falls on top of him. Robbie is blamed. Ultimately, he is expelled from school. His father demands to know why Robbie hurt his classmate. When Robbie explains to his father that he did not deliberately do that and the desk moved itself, his father does not believe him and decides to physically punish him. Before he can, the chair on which Robbie is sitting moves out from under him, making Robbie crash to the floor. Robbie's parents feel someone or something is trying to harm their child. They feel he may really be "possessed".

They take him to the Lutheran Pastor Reverend Eckhardt, who believes what they are experiencing is a poltergeist. He takes Robbie to his house to put him under exact monitoring (by putting him in a special room and attaching a light in front of his bed to help him record daily reactions by his camera). During Robbie's stay, several things occur that convince Eckhardt that Robbie is being afflicted by demons: strange noises are made in the house, the wall clock is smashed, and Robbie falls into fits of rage and hysteria. When Eckhardt tells his wife that Robbie should be treated by the Catholics, Robbie attacks him.

McBride visits the family in their house to check on Robbie after his parents go to the university requesting help. During one of Robbie's fits of hysteria, the parents find the letters SLU scrawled on his belly. When McBride enters his room, he is attacked and becomes convinced that the child is endowed with some sort of supernatural power. He convinces Bowdern to visit the family.

Bowdern visits Robbie in his room, comforting him with his knowledge of comic books. Bowdern notices that Robbie is interested in magic and ventriloquism, while Robbie notices that Bowdern is affected by his collection of toy soldiers that sets off a post traumatic stress disorder event. When Father Bowdern tries to convince the parents that there is nothing wrong with Robbie, the boy suddenly becomes hysterical, speaking in Latin as things fly across the room. Bowdern becomes convinced that Robbie must undergo treatment.

Bowdern and McBride go to Archbishop Hume to persuade him to give Robbie an exorcism. The Archbishop is skeptical, saying that he is trying to improve the Catholic Church's public image as a modern institution, free of ancient superstition. He requests to speak to McBride alone, and he nominates Bowdern to handle the issue.

Bowdern begins Robbie's treatment, assisted by McBride and Father Walter Halloran. They conduct several visits to him during which Robbie starts throwing temper tantrums. He scratches at them, vomits and urinates on them, and swears uncontrollably. During the treatment trials, Bowdern has flashbacks to his war experiences and dreads that this may be another failure. Robbie is transferred twice to two different churches. Finally, Bowdern manages to cure him. The room in the church where the exorcism takes place is locked on Archbishop Hume's orders.

== Cast ==
- Timothy Dalton as Fr. William S. Bowdern
- Henry Czerny as Fr. Raymond McBride
- Jonathan Malen as Robbie Mannhiem
- Michael Rhoades as Karl Mannheim
- Shannon Lawson as Phyllis Mannheim
- Christopher Plummer as Archbishop Hume
- Piper Laurie as Aunt Hanna
- Richard Waugh as Reverend Eckhardt
- Michael McLachlan as Fr. Walter Halloran
