= Damien Karras =

Fictional character

- The Exorcist character
- Jason Miller as Father Damien Karras in The Exorcist
- First appearance: The Exorcist (1971 novel)
- Last appearance: The Exorcist III (1990 film)
- Created by: William Peter Blatty
- Portrayed by: Jason Miller (films); Robert Glenister (BBC Radio); David Wilson Barnes (stage); Adam Garcia (stage)

In-universe information
- Occupation: Priest
- Nationality: Greek American
- Education: Catholic priesthood, medical doctor (M.D.), board certified psychiatrist
- Origin: Greece

Father Damien "Demis" Karras, SJ, is a fictional character from the 1971 novel The Exorcist, its 1983 sequel Legion, one of the main protagonists in the 1973 film The Exorcist, and a supporting character in The Exorcist III, the 1990 film adaptation of Legion. He is portrayed by American playwright and stage actor Jason Miller.

== Appearances ==
=== The Exorcist ===
In William Peter Blatty's 1971 novel, Father Damien Karras was one of the priests who exorcises the demon from young Regan MacNeil. He is a Jesuit psychiatrist suffering a crisis of faith. He searches for proof to lead an exorcism, yet during his investigation he comes to realize that there is no better way for God to prove His own existence than to reveal the foul presence of a demon; in God's perspective, He appeared not to waste His time on a skeptic, but instead to aid the callings of Father Lankester Merrin to rescue the child victim. During the exorcism, the demon frequently brings up the subject of Karras's mother's death and how he was not there to see her die, which seems to trouble Karras emotionally. Karras dies by throwing himself down a flight of stairs in order to purge the demon from his own body after having coaxed it out of Regan's.

=== Legion ===
In the 1983 sequel, it is revealed that after the demon departed, another evil spirit invaded Karras's body. Karras was found wandering and amnesiac, and was placed in the care of a mental hospital near Washington, D.C. While incarcerated there, the spirit suppresses Karras's personality and makes forays into the bodies of other patients in order to commit a series of ritual murders.

== Adaptations ==
In the films The Exorcist and The Exorcist III, he is played by Jason Miller (who was in fact educated at the Jesuit University of Scranton).

Jack Nicholson was up for the part of Karras before Stacy Keach was hired by Blatty. According to The Exorcist director William Friedkin, Paul Newman also wanted to portray Karras. Friedkin then spotted Miller following a performance of Miller's play That Championship Season in New York. Even though Miller had never acted in movies, Keach's contract was bought out by Warner Bros. and Miller was signed.

Karras is voiced by Robert Glenister in the 2014 BBC Radio dramatization.

== In popular culture ==
In Percival Everett's Dr. No, an atheistic priest named Damien Karras appears in four chapters in two parts. He assists Wala Kitu and Eigen Vector with nothing before double-crossing them and getting shot to death by the villain, John Milton Bradley Sill.

John Ward, the main protagonist of Faith: The Unholy Trinity is inspired by Karras and his appearance is based on Jason Miller’s portrayal of the character in the 1973 adaptation.

== See also ==
- Exorcism of Roland Doe
- Raymond J. Bishop
- William S. Bowdern
