= Exorcist II: The Heretic =

1977 film by John Boorman

- Theatrical release poster
- Directed by: John Boorman
- Written by: William Goodhart
- Based on: Characters by William Peter Blatty
- Produced by: John Boorman; Richard Lederer
- Starring: Linda Blair; Richard Burton; Louise Fletcher; Max von Sydow; Kitty Winn; Paul Henreid; James Earl Jones
- Cinematography: William A. Fraker
- Edited by: Tom Priestley
- Music by: Ennio Morricone
- Distributed by: Warner Bros.
- Release date: June 17, 1977 (United States)
- Running time: 102 minutes
- Country: United States
- Language: English
- Budget: $14 million
- Box office: $30.7 million

Exorcist II: The Heretic is a 1977 American supernatural science fiction horror film directed by John Boorman and written by William Goodhart. It is the second installment in The Exorcist film series and the sequel to The Exorcist (1973), and stars Linda Blair, Richard Burton, Louise Fletcher, Max von Sydow, Kitty Winn, Paul Henreid, and James Earl Jones. It was the last film to feature Henreid before his 1992 death. Set four years after the previous film, the film centers on the now 16-year-old Regan MacNeil, who is still recovering from her previous demonic possession.

Exorcist II: The Heretic was theatrically released in the United States on June 17, 1977, by Warner Bros. The film received generally negative reviews from critics and is often considered to be one of the worst films ever made. Despite earning over $30 million domestically against a $14 million production budget, the negative reception meant that the next film in The Exorcist series would not come until The Exorcist III on August 17, 1990. In 2025, a documentary film about Exorcist II's making and reception, titled Boorman and the Devil, was released to critical acclaim.

== Plot ==
Philip Lamont, a priest struggling with his faith, attempts to exorcise a possessed woman in Latin America who claims to "heal the sick". However, the exorcism goes wrong and the woman knocks over lit candles, setting the place ablaze, and a candle inadvertently sets fire to her dress as well, killing her. Afterward, Lamont is assigned by the Cardinal to investigate the death of Father Lankester Merrin, who had been killed four years earlier in the course of exorcising the Assyrian demon Pazuzu from Regan MacNeil. (Note: As depicted in The Exorcist (1973)) The Cardinal informs Lamont that Merrin is facing posthumous heresy charges because of his controversial writings, as Church authorities are trying to modernise and do not want to acknowledge that Satan exists.

Regan, although now seemingly normal and staying with her guardian Sharon Spencer in New York City, continues to be monitored at a psychiatric institute by Dr. Gene Tuskin. Regan claims that she remembers nothing about her ordeal in Washington, D.C., but Tuskin believes that her memories are repressed.

Father Lamont visits the institute, but his attempts to question Regan about the circumstances of Merrin's death are rebuffed by Tuskin, who believes that Lamont's approach would do Regan more harm than good. In an attempt to plumb her memories of the exorcism, and specifically the circumstances in which Merrin died, Tuskin hypnotizes Regan, to whom she is linked by a "synchronizer", a revolutionary biofeedback device used by two people to synchronize their brainwaves. After a guided tour by Sharon of the Georgetown house where the exorcism took place, Lamont returns to be coupled with Regan by the synchronizer. The priest is spirited to the past by Pazuzu to observe Merrin exorcising a young boy, Kokumo, in Africa. Learning that the boy developed special powers to fight Pazuzu, who appears as a swarm of locusts, Lamont journeys to Africa, defying his superior, to seek help from the adult Kokumo.

Kokumo has become a scientist studying how to prevent locust swarms. Lamont learns that Pazuzu attacks people who have psychic healing abilities. Regan is able to reach telepathically inside the minds of others; she uses this to help an autistic girl to speak as she waits to see Tuskin. Tuskin and her staff are shocked, but the girl's mother is too overjoyed to care, and despite Tuskin's attempt to keep them in the office to figure out what happened, insists on going home so the girl's father can hear her as well. Father Merrin, who belonged to a group of theologians that believed psychic powers were a spiritual gift that would one day be shared by all people, thought people like Kokumo and Regan were forerunners of this new type of humanity. In a vision, Merrin asks Lamont to watch over Regan.

Lamont and Regan return to the old house in Georgetown. The pair is followed in a taxi by Tuskin and Sharon, who are concerned about Regan's safety. En route, Pazuzu tempts Lamont by offering him unlimited power, appearing as a succubus who is a doppelgänger of Regan. The taxi crashes into the Georgetown house, killing the driver, but Tuskin and Sharon survive; at the front of the house Sharon sets herself on fire. Although Lamont initially succumbs to the succubus, he is brought back by Regan and attacks her doppelgänger while a swarm of locusts deluges the house, which begins to crumble around them. However, Lamont manages to kill the doppelgänger by beating open its chest and pulling out its heart. In the end, Regan banishes the locusts (and Pazuzu) by enacting the same bullroarer ritual attempted by Kokumo to get rid of locusts in Africa (although he failed and was possessed). Outside the house, Sharon dies from her injuries and Tuskin tells Lamont to watch over Regan. Regan and Lamont leave while Tuskin stays to answer police questions.

== Cast ==
- Linda Blair as Regan MacNeil
  - Karen Knapp as Pazuzu possessed Regan
- Kitty Winn as Sharon Spencer
- Richard Burton as Father Philip Lamont
- Louise Fletcher as Dr. Gene Tuskin
- Max von Sydow as Father Lankester Merrin
- Paul Henreid as Cardinal Jaros
- James Earl Jones as Kokumo
  - Joey Green as Young Kokumo
- Ned Beatty as Edwards
- Rose Portillo as Spanish Girl
- Barbara Cason as Mrs. Phalor
- Richard Paul as Plane Passenger
- Ken Renard as Abbot
- Hank Garrett as Conductor

== Production ==
=== Development ===
Neither William Peter Blatty nor William Friedkin, the writer/producer and the director, respectively, of the original The Exorcist, had any desire to involve themselves in an Exorcist sequel. This was because they had filed lawsuits against both the studio and each other over profits, credits, and Blatty being barred from post-production during the first film. According to the film's co-producer Richard Lederer, Exorcist II was conceived as a relatively low-budget affair: "What we essentially wanted to do with the sequel was to redo the first movie... Have the central figure, an investigative priest, interview everyone involved with the exorcism, then fade out to unused footage, unused angles from the first film. A low-budget rehash — about $3 million — of The Exorcist, a rather cynical approach to movie-making, I'll admit. But that was the start".

Playwright William Goodhart was commissioned to write the screenplay, titled The Heretic; he based it around the theories of Pierre Teilhard de Chardin (the Jesuit paleontologist/archaeologist who had inspired the character of Father Merrin in Blatty's novel The Exorcist). Goodhart's screenplay took a more metaphysical and intellectual approach compared with the original film. Here, the battle between good and evil would center on human consciousness—with the specific idea that, within the framework of Catholic theology, human consciousnesses could be brought together as one through technology, although this would also result in conflict between those who sought good and evil.

Sam O'Steen initially agreed to direct the film, but never officially attached himself to the production. British filmmaker John Boorman signed on to direct, stating that "the idea of making a metaphysical thriller greatly appealed to my psyche". Years earlier, Boorman had been considered by Warner Bros. as a possible director for the original film, but he turned the opportunity down as he found the story "rather repulsive". However, he was intrigued with the idea of directing a sequel, explaining that "every film has to struggle to find a connection with its audience. Here I saw the chance to make an extremely ambitious film without having to spend the time developing this connection. I could make assumptions and then take the audience on a very adventurous cinematic journey".

=== Casting ===
Linda Blair agreed to reprise her role of Regan MacNeil for Exorcist II, but refused to wear demon make-up (a double was used for the brief flashback scenes depicting a demonic Regan). Max von Sydow was persuaded by Boorman to reprise the role of Father Merrin; he was initially reluctant to return because of his concerns over the negative impact of the first Exorcist film. Kitty Winn signed on to reprise the role of Sharon Spencer for Exorcist II after Ellen Burstyn flatly refused to return as Chris MacNeil.

Boorman contacted William O'Malley to reprise his role as Father Joseph Dyer from the first film. However, O'Malley was busy and could not take up the part, and the character of Father Dyer was changed to Father Philip Lamont. Jon Voight, David Carradine, Jack Nicholson and Christopher Walken all were considered for or offered the part of Father Lamont, who John Boorman initially conceived as a younger priest in awe of Father Merrin's writings. As mentioned in Variety, Voight initially signed on for the role but left in April 1976 when "differences about the role could not be resolved". He was replaced with Richard Burton signing on for the role.

The role of Dr. Gene Tuskin was originally written for a man, with Chris Sarandon and George Segal both considered. When the sex of the character was changed, both Ann-Margret and Jane Fonda were under consideration. Louise Fletcher, who had just won the Academy Award for Best Actress for One Flew Over the Cuckoo's Nest (1975), accepted the part.

=== Screenplay and filming ===
Principal photography began at Burbank Studios on May 24, 1976, with a budget of $11 million (the film ultimately cost $14 million to make). Although Boorman wanted to film the majority of the film on location (including Ethiopia and The Vatican), many of his plans proved to be impossible, resulting in key exterior scenes having to be filmed at the Warner Bros. backlot. Even the MacNeil house in Georgetown had to be replicated in the studio because the filmmakers were refused permission to film at the original house. The filmmakers also had to replicate the infamous "Hitchcock Steps" adjacent to the MacNeil house, as they were refused permission by Washington city officials to shoot scenes by the real steps. There were also two weeks of filming in the New York metropolitan area. A key scene of a sleepwalking Regan about to wander off a rooftop was filmed in New York City, atop 666 Fifth Avenue (where the studio's offices were then located). With no stunt person and no special effects, the shot showed actress Linda Blair's feet on the edge of the building with Fifth Avenue down below. Scenes were also filmed at Pennsylvania Station in Newark, New Jersey.

Boorman was unhappy with Goodhart's script and asked Goodhart to do a rewrite incorporating ideas from Rospo Pallenberg. Goodhart refused, so the script was subsequently rewritten by Pallenberg and Boorman. Goodhart's script was being constantly rewritten as the film was shooting, with the filmmakers uncertain as to how the story should end. Linda Blair recalled: "It was a really good script at first. Then after everybody signed on they rewrote it five times and it ended up nothing like the same movie".

Exorcist II was beset by numerous problems during production. Boorman contracted a case of San Joaquin Valley fever (a respiratory fungal infection), which canceled production for over a month (a costly delay). Other problems included footage being oversaturated and necessitating reshoots; the rapid deaths of locusts imported from England for the film's climactic scenes (2500 locusts were shipped in and died at a rate of 100 a day); original film editor John Merritt quitting the production (he was replaced by Tom Priestley), and stars Kitty Winn and Louise Fletcher both suffering from gallbladder infections.

Blair said in one interview that Pallenberg directed a lot of the film as well as did rewrites. Pallenberg was credited as the second unit director and a "creative associate".

== Release ==
=== Box office ===
The Heretic was Warner Bros.'s largest day and date launch, opening in 725 theatres in the United States and Canada and set an opening weekend record for the studio. with $6.7 million, but poor word of mouth dramatically hampered its performance. The film eventually grossed $30,749,142 in the United States, turning a profit but still disappointing in comparison to the original film's gross.

=== Critical reception ===
The film received a strongly negative response. Reports indicated that the film inspired derisive audience laughter at its premiere in New York City. William Peter Blatty claimed to have been the first person to start laughing at the theater in which he saw the film, only to be followed by the other patrons ("You'd think we were watching The Producers"). William Friedkin, director of The Exorcist, recalled hearing a story in which angry audience members at Exorcist II's first public performance began chasing Warner Bros. executives down the street within the first 10 minutes of the screening. Friedkin saw half an hour of the film: "I was at Technicolor and a guy said 'We just finished a print of Exorcist II, do you wanna have a look at it?' And I looked at half an hour of it, and I thought it was as bad as seeing a traffic accident in the street. It was horrible. It's just a stupid mess made by a dumb guy – John Boorman by name, somebody who should be nameless, but in this case should be named. Scurrilous. A horrible picture." Friedkin later said that this sequel diminished the value of the original, and called it "the worst piece of crap I've ever seen" and "a freaking disgrace." He later added: "That film was made by a demented mind."

one of the film's shortcomings "the frequent unintended and therefore devastating humor in William Goodhart's solemn and bizarre script" The Los Angeles Times, review, 18 June 1977

Variety wrote, "Exorcist II is not as good as The Exorcist. It isn't even close." BBC film critic Mark Kermode stated "Exorcist II is demonstrably the worst film ever made. It took the greatest film ever made and trashed it in a way that was on one level farcically stupid and on another level absolutely unforgivable. Everyone involved in this, apart from Linda Blair, should be ashamed for all eternity." Christopher Porterfield wrote in Time Magazine, "Most sequels offer more of the same. This one offers less of the same. But what remains is twaddle. In truth, the only synthesis in the film is between the ludicrous and the unintentionally comic." Vincent Canby, writing in The New York Times, was similarly dismissive:

Given the huge box-office success of the William Peter Blatty – William Friedkin production of The Exorcist, there had to be a sequel, but did it have to be this desperate concoction, the main thrust of which is that [the] original exorcism wasn't all it was cracked up to be? It's one thing to carry a story further along, but it's another to deny the original, no matter what you thought of it. I thought it was something even less than good, but this new film, which opened yesterday at the Criterion and other theaters, is of such spectacular fatuousness that it makes the first seem virtually an axiom of screen art.

Gene Siskel of the Chicago Tribune gave the film zero stars out of four and declared it "the worst major motion picture I've seen in almost eight years on the job." John Simon wrote, "there is a very strong probability that Exorcist II is the stupidest major movie ever made," and Jack Lewis wrote in the Daily Mirror: "It's all too ludicrous to frighten, and the only time you're likely to hide your head will be in shame for watching it." Donald McClean wrote in The Bay Reporter, "Exorcist II gives us something to sink our teeth into. It's unintentionally the funniest film to come along in ages; William Goodhart once wrote a Broadway comedy, I think this is his second. The dialogue invites hoots of derision and audience catcalls, and director John Boorman strives to be intellectually scary and only succeeds in turning a former shocker into a current piece of schlock." Russell Davies wrote in The U.K. Observer, "From the start, the film is either unbearably silly or incomprehensible and, finally, both at once." Ruth Batchelor's review for The Los Angeles Free Press stated, "I never thought I'd appreciate Billy Friedkin, because I didn't like The Exorcist very much, but Exorcist II: The Heretic makes The Exorcist numero uno look like Citizen Kane [...] This movie is a laughable horror [...] It should be Exorcised out of the theatres." Bernard Drew wrote in The San Bernardino Sun, "it is ridiculous — hopelessly confused and incomprehensible. Upon who's [sic] feet to lay the blame for this disaster I do not know [...] There's blame enough for everybody involved in this." Spanish film critic Fernando Trueba's review in El País called Exorcist II "a stupid and useless film whose mere existence is difficult to justify." Alexander Walker wrote in the London Evening Standard, "Apart from being incomprehensible much of the time, the film is pretentious, all of it. Whatever possessed them?" Joe Pollack wrote in the St. Louis Post Dispatch, "Sequels usually are not as good as the original motion picture, but they're not usually as bad as Exorcist II: The Heretic, which is, in a word, atrocious. Filled with claptrap and nonsense signifying nothing."

Leslie Halliwell described the film as a "highly unsatisfactory psychic melodrama which [...] falls flat on its face along some wayward path of metaphysical and religious fancy. It was released in two versions and is unintelligible in either." Leonard Maltin described the film as a "preposterous sequel [...] Special effects are the only virtue in this turkey". Steven Scheuer wrote, "This may be the worst sequel in the history of film." Danny Peary dismissed Exorcist II as "absurd." In his 1984 book The Hollywood Hall of Shame, Michael Medved called the film "a thoroughly wretched piece of work," and added, "Richard Burton is a laugh a minute." Edward Margulies called the film a "calamitious, head-scratching, sequel" and "a rollicking mess," and wondered, "whatever possessed them?" The Blockbuster Entertainment Guide to Movies & Videos gave this film its lowest possible rating and dismissed its story as "the expected demonic shenanigans."

In contrast, Pauline Kael preferred Boorman's sequel to the original, writing in The New Yorker that Exorcist II "had more visual magic than a dozen movies." Kim Newman commented that "Exorcist II doesn't work in all sorts of ways... However, like Ennio Morricone's mix of tribal and liturgical music, it does manage to be very interesting." Director Martin Scorsese asserted, "The picture asks: Does great goodness bring upon itself great evil? This goes back to the Book of Job; it's God testing the good. In this sense, Regan (Linda Blair) is a modern-day saint — like Ingrid Bergman in Europa '51, and in a way, like Charlie in Mean Streets. I like the first Exorcist, because of the Catholic guilt I have, and because it scared the hell out of me; but The Heretic surpasses it. Maybe Boorman failed to execute the material, but the movie still deserved better than it got."

Author Bob McCabe's 2000 book The Exorcist: Out of the Shadows contains a chapter on the film in which Linda Blair said it was "one of the big disappointments of my career," and John Boorman commented: "The sin I committed was not giving the audience what it wanted in terms of horror... There's this wild beast out there which is the audience. I created this arena and I just didn't throw enough Christians into it". McCabe offered no one answer as to why Exorcist II failed: "Who knows where the blame ultimately lies? Boorman's illness and constant revising of the script can't have helped, but these events alone are not enough to explain the film's almighty failure. Boorman has certainly gone on to produce some fine work subsequently... When a list was compiled for The 50 Worst Movies Ever Made, Exorcist II: The Heretic came in at number two. It was beaten only by Ed Wood's Plan 9 from Outer Space, a film that generally receives a warmer response from its audience than this terribly misjudged sequel."

In a 2005 interview, Boorman remarked:

It all comes down to audience expectations. The film that I made, I saw as a kind of riposte to the ugliness and darkness of The Exorcist – I wanted a film about journeys that was positive, about good, essentially. And I think that audiences, in hindsight, were right. I denied them what they wanted and they were pissed off about it – quite rightly, I knew I wasn't giving them what they wanted and it was a really foolish choice. The film itself, I think, is an interesting one – there's some good work in it – but when they came to me with it I told John Calley, who was running Warner Bros. then, that I didn't want it. "Look", I said, "I have daughters, I don't want to make a film about torturing a child", which is how I saw the original film. But then I read a three-page treatment for a sequel written by a man named William Goodhart and I was really intrigued by it because it was about goodness. I saw it then as a chance to film a riposte to the first picture. But it had one of the most disastrous openings ever – there were riots! And we recut the actual prints in the theatres, about six a day, but it didn't help of course and I couldn't bear to talk about it, or look at it, for years.

As of January 2025, Exorcist II: The Heretic holds a 10% rating on review aggregator Rotten Tomatoes based on 69 reviews, with an average rating of 3.6/10. The site's consensus reads, "Hokey mystical effects, lousy plotting, and worse acting directly tarnishes the first's chilling legacy." On Metacritic, the film has a weighted average score of 39 out of 100 based on 11 critics, indicating "generally unfavorable" reviews.

=== Home media ===
Exorcist II: The Heretic was originally released on VHS in the United States. The LaserDisc was exclusively released in Japan. A VHS reissue was released in the US on December 4, 1992, by Warner Home Video. It was first released on DVD format on August 6, 2002, in Snapcase packaging, while a second DVD was made available in standard packaging on November 3, 2009. Additionally, the film is available as part of "The Complete Anthology" set, which features all five films of the franchise, and was released on DVD on October 10, 2006.

The film was released on Blu-ray for the first time in both an individual set and as part of the Blu-ray release of "The Complete Anthology" on September 23, 2014.

On September 25, 2018, Scream Factory, a subsidiary of Shout Factory, released Exorcist II: The Heretic on Blu-ray in a newly commissioned two-disc "Collector's Edition". The set includes the theatrical cut, a shorter alternative version of the film, new interviews with Linda Blair and editor Tom Priestly, as well as commentary tracks from director John Boorman and project consultant Scott Bosco. This two disc set also got a Region B release by Arrow Video in the UK on October 7, 2024. Including both versions of the film, there are a total of 5 commentary tracks in this release.

=== Legacy ===
A documentary film about the troubled production of Exorcist II: The Heretic, entitled Boorman and the Devil, was released in 2025.

== See also ==
- List of 20th century films considered the worst
- Art horror

== Bibliography ==
- Castell, Ron, ed. (1996). Blockbuster Entertainment guide to movies and videos, 1997. Dell Publishing. ISBN 0-440-22275-3.
- Fernandez, Declan Neil (June 2022). Horrible and Fascinating - John Boorman's Exorcist II : The Heretic. BearManor Media. ISBN 978-1-62933-949-8.
- Halliwell, Leslie (1995). Halliwell's Film Guide (Fifth ed.). Harper Collins.
- Maltin, Leonard (2008). Leonard Maltin's 2009 Movie Guide. Plume. ISBN 978-0-45122-468-2.
- Margulies, Edward; Rebello, Stephen (1993). Bad Movies We Love. Plume. ISBN 978-0-452-27005-3.
- McCabe, Bob (2000). The Exorcist: Out of the Shadows. Omnibus Press. ISBN 978-0-71197-509-5.
- Medved, Michael (1984). Hollywood Hall of Shame: The Most Expensive Flops in Movie History. Penguin. ISBN 978-0-39950-714-4.
- Muir, John Kenneth (2002). Horror Films of the 1970s. McFarland. ISBN 978-0-78649-156-8.
- Newman, Kim (2011). Nightmare Movies: Horror on Screen Since the 1960s. Bloomsbury USA. ISBN 978-1-40880-503-9.
- Pallenberg, Barbara (1977). The Making of Exorcist II: The Heretic. New York: Warner Books. ISBN 978-0-44689-361-9.
- Peary, Danny (1986). Guide for the Film Fanatic. Simon & Schuster. ISBN 978-0-67161-081-4.
- Segaloff, Nat (2023). The Exorcist Legacy: 50 Years of Fear. Kensington Publishing. ISBN 9780806541945.
- Scheuer, Steven (1991). Movies on TV and Videocassette. Bantam Books. ISBN 978-0-55329-147-6.
