= The Exorcist (TV series) =

2016 American supernatural horror television series

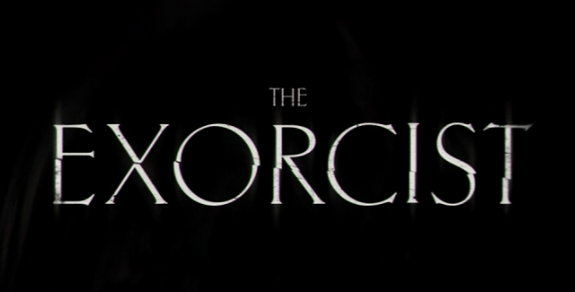
- Genre: Supernatural; Horror
- Created by: Jeremy Slater
- Based on: The Exorcist by William Peter Blatty
- Starring: Alfonso Herrera; Ben Daniels; Hannah Kasulka; Brianne Howey; Kurt Egyiawan; Alan Ruck; Geena Davis; Li Jun Li; Brianna Hildebrand; John Cho; Zuleikha Robinson
- Composers: Daniel Hart (season 1); Tyler Bates (season 2)
- Country of origin: United States
- Original language: English
- No. of seasons: 2
- No. of episodes: 20

Production
- Executive producers: Jeremy Slater; Rolin Jones; Rupert Wyatt; James Robinson; David Robinson; Barbara Wall; Roy Lee; Sean Crouch; Jason Ensler (season 2)
- Producers: Robert M. Williams, Jr.; Charise Castro Smith; Judd Rea
- Production locations: Chicago, Illinois, U.S. (season 1); Vancouver, British Columbia, Canada (season 2)
- Cinematography: Alex Disenhof
- Running time: 45 minutes
- Production companies: Morgan Creek Productions; New Neighborhood Productions (season 1); 20th Century Fox Television

Original release
- Network: Fox
- Release: September 23, 2016 – December 15, 2017

Related
- The Exorcist (1973 film)

The Exorcist is an American supernatural horror television series created by Jeremy Slater for Fox. Part of The Exorcist franchise, the series serves as a direct sequel to the original 1973 film and ignores the film's various sequels and prequels. Alfonso Herrera and Ben Daniels star as a pair of exorcists who investigate cases of demonic possession.

The series premiered on September 23, 2016, and a second season premiered on September 29, 2017, each comprising 10 episodes. In May 2018, the series was canceled after two seasons.

== Cast ==
=== Main ===
- Alfonso Herrera as Father Tomas Ortega
- Ben Daniels as Father Marcus Keane
- Hannah Kasulka as Casey Rance (season 1; guest season 2)
- Brianne Howey as Kat Rance (season 1)
- Kurt Egyiawan as Father Devon Bennett
- Alan Ruck as Henry Rance (season 1)
- Geena Davis as Angela Rance / Regan MacNeil (season 1)
  - Sophie Thatcher as young Regan MacNeil (season 1)
- Li Jun Li as Rose Cooper (season 2)
- Brianna Hildebrand as Verity (season 2)
- John Cho as Andy Kim (season 2)
- Zuleikha Robinson as Mouse (season 2)

=== Recurring ===
- Robert Emmet Lunney as the Salesman / Captain Howdy / Pazuzu (season 1)
- Mouzam Makkar as Jessica (season 1)
- Kirsten Fitzgerald as Maria Walters
- Sharon Gless as Chris MacNeil (season 1)
- Camille Guaty as Olivia (season 1)
- Deanna Dunagan as Mother Bernadette (season 1)
- Torrey Hanson as Cardinal Guillot
- Francis Guinan as Brother Simon (season 1)
- Cyrus Arnold as David "Truck" Johnson III (season 2)
- Hunter Dillon as Caleb (season 2)
- Alex Barima as Shelby (season 2)
- Amélie Eve as Grace (season 2)
- Christopher Cousins as Peter Osborne (season 2)
- Alicia Witt as Nicole Kim (season 2)
- Zibby Allen as Cindy (season 2)
- Beatrice Kitsos as Harper Graham (season 2)

== Episodes ==
| Season | Episodes | Originally released | | Rank | Viewers (millions) |
| Season | Episodes | First released | Last released | Rank | Viewers (millions) |
|---|---|---|---|---|---|
| 1 | 10 | September 23, 2016 | December 16, 2016 | 127 | 3.15 |
| 2 | 10 | September 29, 2017 | December 15, 2017 | 176 | 1.94 |

=== Season 1 (2016) ===
| No. overall | No. in season | Title | Directed by | Written by | Original release date | Prod. code | US viewers (millions) |
|---|---|---|---|---|---|---|---|
| 1 | 1 | "Chapter One: And Let My Cry Come Unto Thee" | Rupert Wyatt | Teleplay and Story by : Jeremy Slater | September 23, 2016 | 1AZP01 | 2.85 |
| 2 | 2 | "Chapter Two: Lupus in Fabula" | Michael Nankin | Heather Bellson | September 30, 2016 | 1AZP02 | 1.98 |
| 3 | 3 | "Chapter Three: Let 'Em In" | Michael Nankin | Dre Ryan | October 7, 2016 | 1AZP03 | 1.95 |
| 4 | 4 | "Chapter Four: The Moveable Feast" | Craig Zisk | Adam Stein | October 14, 2016 | 1AZP04 | 1.97 |
| 5 | 5 | "Chapter Five: Through My Most Grievous Fault" | Jason Ensler | David Grimm | October 21, 2016 | 1AZP05 | 1.87 |
| 6 | 6 | "Chapter Six: Star of the Morning" | Jennifer Phang | Laura Marks | November 4, 2016 | 1AZP06 | 1.83 |
| 7 | 7 | "Chapter Seven: Father of Lies" | Tinge Krishnan | Charise Castro Smith | November 11, 2016 | 1AZP07 | 1.61 |
| 8 | 8 | "Chapter Eight: The Griefbearers" | Louis Milito | Marcus Gardley | November 18, 2016 | 1AZP08 | 1.67 |
| 9 | 9 | "Chapter Nine: 162" | Bill Johnson | Franklin Jin Rho & Jeremy Slater | December 9, 2016 | 1AZP09 | 1.66 |
| 10 | 10 | "Chapter Ten: Three Rooms" | Jason Ensler | Jeremy Slater | December 16, 2016 | 1AZP10 | 1.75 |

=== Season 2 (2017) ===
| No. overall | No. in season | Title | Directed by | Written by | Original release date | Prod. code | US viewers (millions) |
|---|---|---|---|---|---|---|---|
| 11 | 1 | "Janus" | Jason Ensler | Heather Bellson | September 29, 2017 | 2AZP01 | 1.58 |
Father Tomas Ortega and Father Marcus Keane try to save Cindy, a woman possessed by a demon following her miscarriage. However, things get complicated when Cindy's husband refuses to believe in his wife's possession and tries to prevent the priests from saving her. But during one of the attempts to save the young woman, the demon arrives to penetrate the spirit of Tomas. On Nachburn, an island off Seattle, Andrew Kim is about to welcome Rose Cooper, a social services representative with whom he has a shared background, to determine whether Andrew's home is suitable for children. Indeed, the latter welcomes a group of children and orphans with problems. One of the children, Caleb, a blind teenager, begins to behave strangely.
| 12 | 2 | "Safe as Houses" | Deran Sarafian | Adam Stein | October 6, 2017 | 2AZP02 | 1.36 |
| 13 | 3 | "Unclean" | Ti West | Manny Coto | October 13, 2017 | 2AZP03 | 1.35 |
| 14 | 4 | "One for Sorrow" | So Yong Kim | Rebecca Kirsch | October 20, 2017 | 2AZP04 | 1.23 |
| 15 | 5 | "There But for the Grace of God, Go I" | Alex García López | Alyssa Clark | November 3, 2017 | 2AZP05 | 1.45 |
| 16 | 6 | "Darling Nikki" | Jason Ensler | Franklin Jin Rho & Adam Stein | November 10, 2017 | 2AZP06 | 1.27 |
| 17 | 7 | "Help Me" | Steven A. Adelson | David Grimm | November 17, 2017 | 2AZP07 | 1.33 |
| 18 | 8 | "A Heaven of Hell" | Meera Menon | Heather Bellson & M. Willis | December 1, 2017 | 2AZP08 | 1.18 |
| 19 | 9 | "Ritual & Repetition" | Elizabeth Allen Rosenbaum | Sean Crouch | December 8, 2017 | 2AZP09 | 1.15 |
| 20 | 10 | "Unworthy" | Jason Ensler | Jeremy Slater | December 15, 2017 | 2AZP10 | 1.28 |
Two officials from the Vatican arrive to deal with Father Bennet. Marcus drags an unconscious Andy through the forest when he meets up with Tomas and Mouse. While Tomas watches over Andy in the abandoned shack, Marcus and Mouse begin to argue. Tomas is drawn into a trance, where he meets up with Andy. Andy tells Tomas to record a message for Rose and the kids. While the demon and Tomas struggle, Andy calls out to Marcus, asking the ex-priest to shoot him before the demon can enter Tomas. Marcus obliges, and fires a bullet into Andy's head, killing both him and the demon. With the demon gone, Tomas breaks free from the trance. Tomas then meets up with Rose and the kids, and he relays Andy's message to them. Marcus parts ways with Tomas. Tomas then leaves with Mouse as his new partner. Meanwhile, Bennet wakes up, and has been possessed. Three months later, Rose visits Truck in a mental hospital, and adopts him, along with Verity, Shelby, Caleb, and Harper. Meanwhile, Marcus is looking out over the water at the docks, when he finally hears God's voice. He becomes troubled, and whispers Tomas's name.

== Production ==
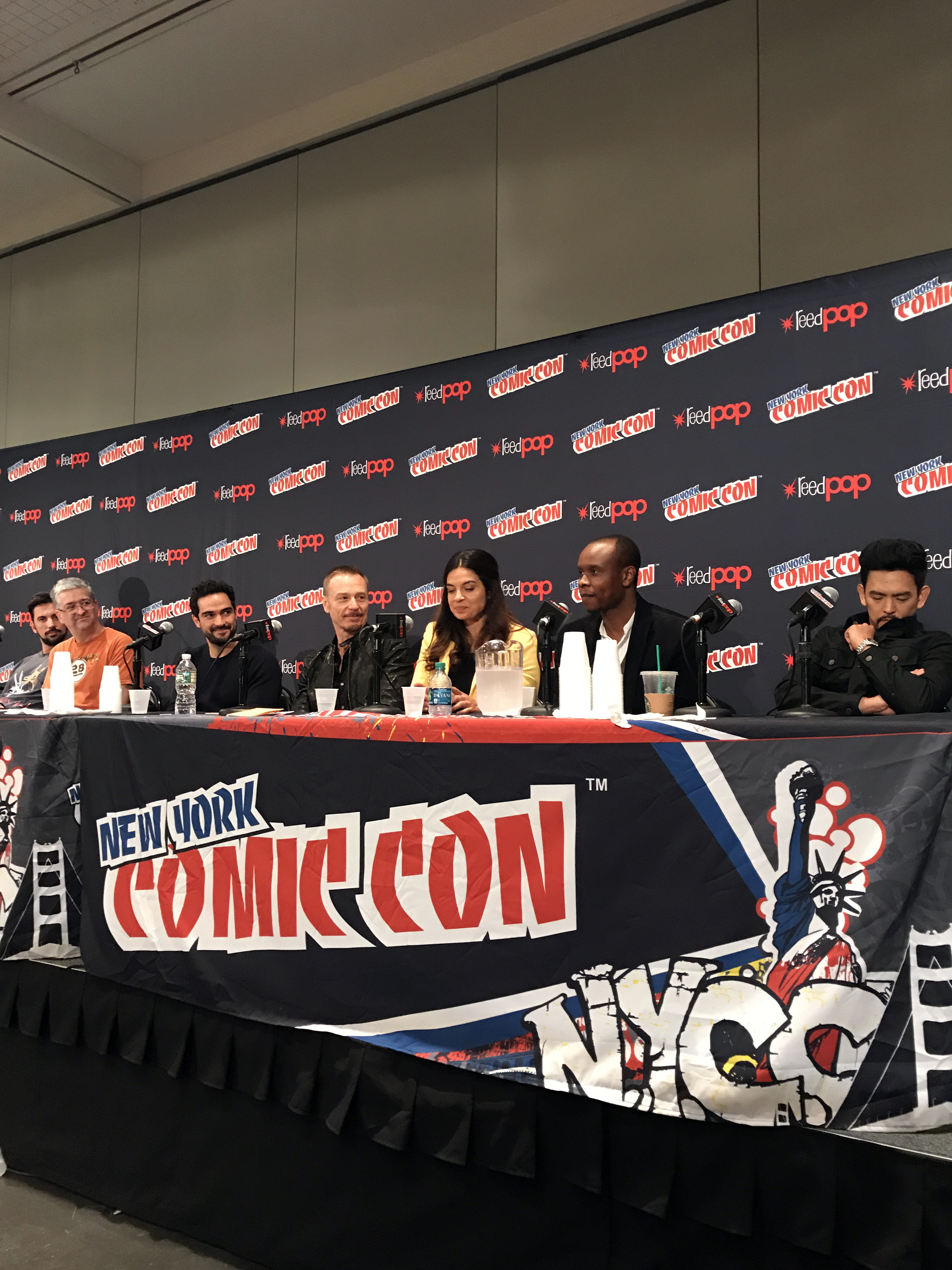
Cast and crew of the series at the 2017 New York Comic Con. From left to right: Producer/writers Jeremy Slater and Sean Crouch; actors Alfonso Herrera, Ben Daniels, Zuleikha Robinson, Kurt Egyiawan, and John Cho.

=== Development ===
Jeremy Slater wrote the pilot. Fox ordered the pilot to be shot in January 2016. The series is described as "a propulsive, serialized psychological thriller following two very different men tackling one family's case of horrifying demonic possession, and confronting the face of true evil".

=== Casting ===
Brianne Howey was cast as Katherine Rance, while Hannah Kasulka was cast as Casey Rance. Alfonso Herrera and Ben Daniels were cast as Father Tomas and Father Marcus respectively, while Kurt Egyiawan was cast as Father Bennett. Geena Davis was cast as Angela Rance. Davis, Ruck, Kasulka and Howey did not return as regular cast members in the second season, while Herrera, Egyiawan and Daniels did return, as their characters preside over a new possession case. John Cho, Brianna Hildebrand, Zuleikha Robinson and Li Jun Li were cast in series regular roles for season two. Christopher Cousins and Cyrus Arnold were cast in recurring roles.

=== Filming ===
The first season of the show was shot in Chicago. Season two filming began in Vancouver in July 2017.

=== Home media ===
DVDs for both seasons are available to purchase through Amazon.com beginning on July 10, 2018.

== Reception ==
=== Ratings ===
Viewership and ratings per season of The Exorcist
| Season | Timeslot (ET) | Episodes | First aired | | Last aired | | TV season | Viewership rank | Avg. viewers (millions) | 18–49 rank |
| Season | Timeslot (ET) | Episodes | Date | Viewers (millions) | Date | Viewers (millions) | TV season | Viewership rank | Avg. viewers (millions) | 18–49 rank |
|---|---|---|---|---|---|---|---|---|---|---|
| 1 | Friday 9:00 p.m. | 10 | September 23, 2016 | 2.85 | December 16, 2016 | 1.75 | 2016–17 | 127 | 3.15 | TBD |
| 2 | Friday 9:00 p.m. | 10 | September 29, 2017 | 1.58 | December 15, 2017 | 1.28 | 2017–18 | 176 | 1.94 | TBD |

=== Critical reception ===
The Exorcist has received generally positive reviews from critics. Review aggregator Rotten Tomatoes gives the first season a score of 79% based on 53 reviews with an average of 6.12/10. The consensus says: "The Exorcist doesn't come close to its classic source material, but still boasts a tense narrative that manages some legitimate scares and credible special effects." On Metacritic, the show has a weighted average of 62/100 based on 28 reviews, indicating "generally favorable reviews".

The second season received a score of 100% based on 11 reviews, with an average of 7.5/10. The consensus says: "The Exorcist continues to haunt in a more confident second season, with an assured storyline and mastery over its demonic flourishes."

=== Awards and nominations ===
| Year | Award | Category | Nominee(s) | Result |
|---|---|---|---|---|
| 2016 | BloodGuts UK Horror Awards | Best TV Show | Morgan Creek Entertainment Group (for The Exorcist) | Nominated |
| 2017 | American Society of Cinematographers Awards | Outstanding Achievement in Cinematography in Television Movie/Miniseries/Pilot | Alex Disenhof | Nominated |
| 2017 | Cine Awards | Best Actor in a Supporting Role in a Drama Series | Ben Daniels | Won |
| 2017 | Cine Awards | Best Breakthrough Actor | Hunter Dillon | Nominated |
| 2017 | Cine Awards | Best Drama TV Series | The Exorcist | Nominated |
| 2017 | Fangoria Chainsaw Awards | Best TV Actress | Geena Davis | Nominated |
| 2017 | Fangoria Chainsaw Awards | Best TV Series | The Exorcist | Nominated |
| 2017 | Fangoria Chainsaw Awards | Best TV Supporting Actor | Ben Daniels | Nominated |
| 2017 | Imagen Foundation Awards | Best Actor - Television | Alfonso Herrera | Nominated |
| 2017 | People's Choice Awards | Favorite New TV Drama | The Exorcist | Nominated |
| 2017 | Saturn Awards | Best Horror Television Series | The Exorcist | Nominated |
| 2018 | Bloody Disgusting Reader's Choice Awards | Best Actor – Television | Alfonso Herrera | Won |
| 2018 | iHorror Awards | Best Horror Series | The Exorcist | Won |
| 2018 | Imagen Foundation Awards | Best Actor – Television | Alfonso Herrera | Nominated |
