= Christopher Neil-Smith =

British priest and exorcist

Christopher Neil-Smith (1920–1995) was an Anglican priest who was vicar of St Saviour's Hampstead and is best known for his practice of exorcism and his parapsychological interests.

Neil-Smith is credited with performing more than 3,000 exorcisms in Britain, starting in 1949. In 1972, the Bishop of London authorized him to exorcise demons according to his own judgement.

Neil-Smith wrote Praying for Daylight: God Through Modern Eyes, as well as The Exorcist and the Possessed, in which he detailed his experiences with and beliefs about exorcism. In the latter, he claimed that evil should be treated as an actual force rather than an abstract idea.

Appearing on radio and television programmes, he became notable as an authority on the subject of exorcism when William Peter Blatty's The Exorcist was released in 1970. According to biographer Trevor Beeson, the media coverage he gained "emphasized the more dramatic elements in his ministry, and encouraged him to extravagances which he later regretted." Neil-Smith died at the age of 75. He was married, and had two sons.

The impact of Christopher Neil-Smith's ministry at St Saviour's Church was to bring issues most closely related to deliverance ministry to the fore, although there is some suggestion that not all his parishioners were entirely enamoured of a priest whose interests, by his own admission, led him for a time into spiritual excesses. A colleague of Neil-Smith, Jack Dover Wellman, vicar of Emmanuel Church, Hampstead was also an authority on the paranormal and upon exorcism, although with a greater emphasis upon Christian spiritual healing. Dover Wellman appears to have taken a gentler approach to his ministry than Neil-Smith sometimes managed, and maintained that to be psychic was a gift from God which needed to be developed in strict conformity with the teachings of Christ.

Following Neil-Smith's retirement, his former vicarage in Eton Road, Hampstead, was purchased by the psychiatrist R.D. Laing, who used it as his home and base for his practice for a number of years. According to biographers, Laing believed the house to be haunted, and performed an exorcism of his own there before taking up residence.

== See also ==
- Johann Blumhardt
