= Scary Maze Game =

2004 video game

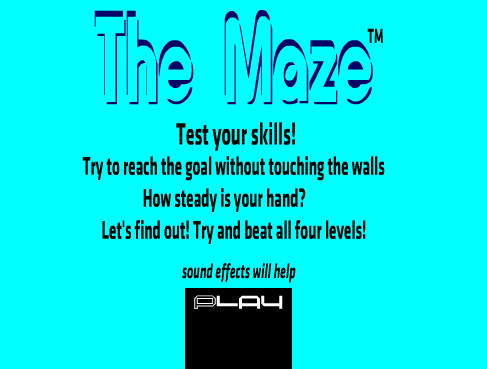
- Developer: Jeremy Winterrowd
- Engine: Adobe Flash
- Platform: Browser
- Release: 2003
- Genres: Maze, horror

The Maze, better known colloquially as Scary Maze Game, is a 2003 horror Flash game created by developer Jeremy Winterrowd. In it, players must navigate through three mazes with their mouse. At the end of the game, the player is jump scared by a photo of Regan MacNeil, a possessed character from the 1973 horror film The Exorcist, before being able to complete the third level.

Scary Maze Game went viral online in the 2000s and early 2010s, largely due to reaction videos of children being pranked by the game, which were also featured on various clip shows and parodied on Saturday Night Live. It has been described as one of the earliest "Internet screamers" and a progenitor of jump scare–based horror games.

== Gameplay ==
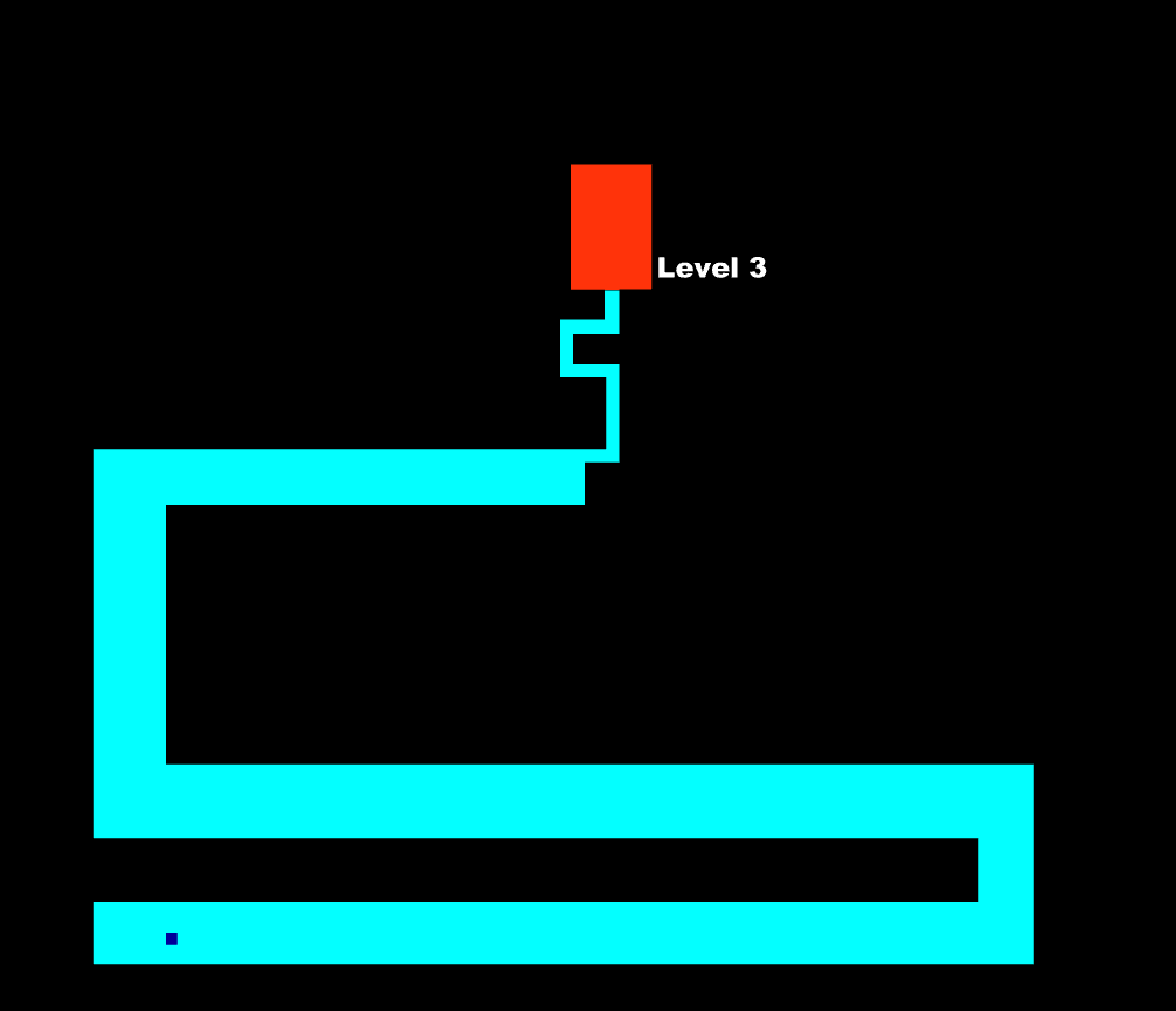
Scary Maze Game's third level, which features a narrow passageway toward the end that encourages players to concentrate, distracting them from the impending jump scare.

In Scary Maze Game, players guide their cursor through three mazes of blue rectangles, avoiding the black walls in order to make it to a red box at the end. The game's third maze features a narrow tunnel toward the end, encouraging players to concentrate to complete it. While navigating through it, players are jump scared by an image of a possessed Regan MacNeil (portrayed by Linda Blair) from the 1973 film The Exorcist accompanied by two loud screams.

== Background and development ==
Scary Maze Game was developed in 2003 by San Francisco–based developer Jeremy Winterrowd using Adobe Flash. He emailed it to several of his friends and it soon went viral. In response to its virality, he developed a website, winterrowd.com, to host it and his other games, which all featured similar jump scares and were not as successful as Scary Maze Game. The website was taken down in 2019 following Flash's discontinuation, the same year that Winterrowd stopped posting on social media. In 2014, Scary Maze Game could also be played on the website scaryforkids.com. As of 2026, Scary Maze Game is available to play on the Internet Archive's website.

== Popularity ==
Reaction videos to Scary Maze Game proliferated from the late 2000s to the early 2010s

Scary Maze Game had become widely popular online by 2008, with Catalin Bocanu of Softpedia noting its "high impact over the public" at the time "despite its simplicity". It was spread online through comedic YouTube reaction videos of people, mostly children, getting pranked by the game. The first Scary Maze Game reaction video to appear on YouTube, titled "Scary Maze Prank—The Original" and featuring a boy of about eight years old being jump scared by the game and crying, was uploaded by the channel CantWeAllJusGetAlong in May 2006. It inspired many of the reaction videos that followed and by 2014, had more than 26 million views and 46 thousand likes. Several reaction videos to Scary Maze Game were featured on the clip shows America's Funniest Home Videos, The Soup, and Web Junk 20, and a 2010 Saturday Night Live sketch featuring Bobby Moynihan parodied reaction videos to the game.

Cameron Simcik of WKDQ praised the videos as "some of the most hilarious reaction videos on the Web" in 2012, while professor Jason Middleton wrote in his 2014 book Documentary's Awkward Turn: Cringe Comedy and Media Spectatorship that they "border[ed] on child abuse" and were "particularly ethically fraught". He also contrasted commenters who found the videos funny, whom he described as demonstrating "an ironic and distanced relation toward images of suffering", with those who did not find them funny due to exhibiting an ethical response. Scary Maze Game reaction videos were used in a naturalistic study of prototypic facial expressions in 2018, in which researchers found, using the Facial Action Coding System (FACS), that less than half of the children featured therein showed the expected expressions for either fear or astonishment.

== Legacy ==
In 2021, Alec Bojalad of Den of Geek retrospectively identified Scary Maze Game as one of the first hits among "Internet screamers", a term used to describe jump scare–based Web content popular in the 2000s and early 2010s. In 2023, for Proceedings of the ACM on Human-Computer Interaction, researchers from Aarhus University described Scary Maze Game as "infamous" and one of "the most basic examples of jump scare games" for having players expend mental resources on trying to complete the maze, thereby making them less anticipatory of the jump scare. Dayten Rose of Rock Paper Shotgun wrote in 2025 that, though its impact was "unsung", Scary Maze Game had "pioneered horror in the internet age". He attributed the success of later jump scare–heavy games like Amnesia: The Dark Descent (2010), Slender: The Eight Pages (2012), and Five Nights at Freddy's (2014) on YouTube to the rise of Scary Maze Game, adding, "If you had an internet connection circa 2005, there's a good chance you played it." As of 2025, Scary Maze Game is the 67th lowest-rated game on the social cataloging website Backloggd.
