= St. Alexius Hospital (Missouri) =

Catholic hospital in St. Louis, 1869–2023

Coordinates: 38.5835°N 90.2286°W

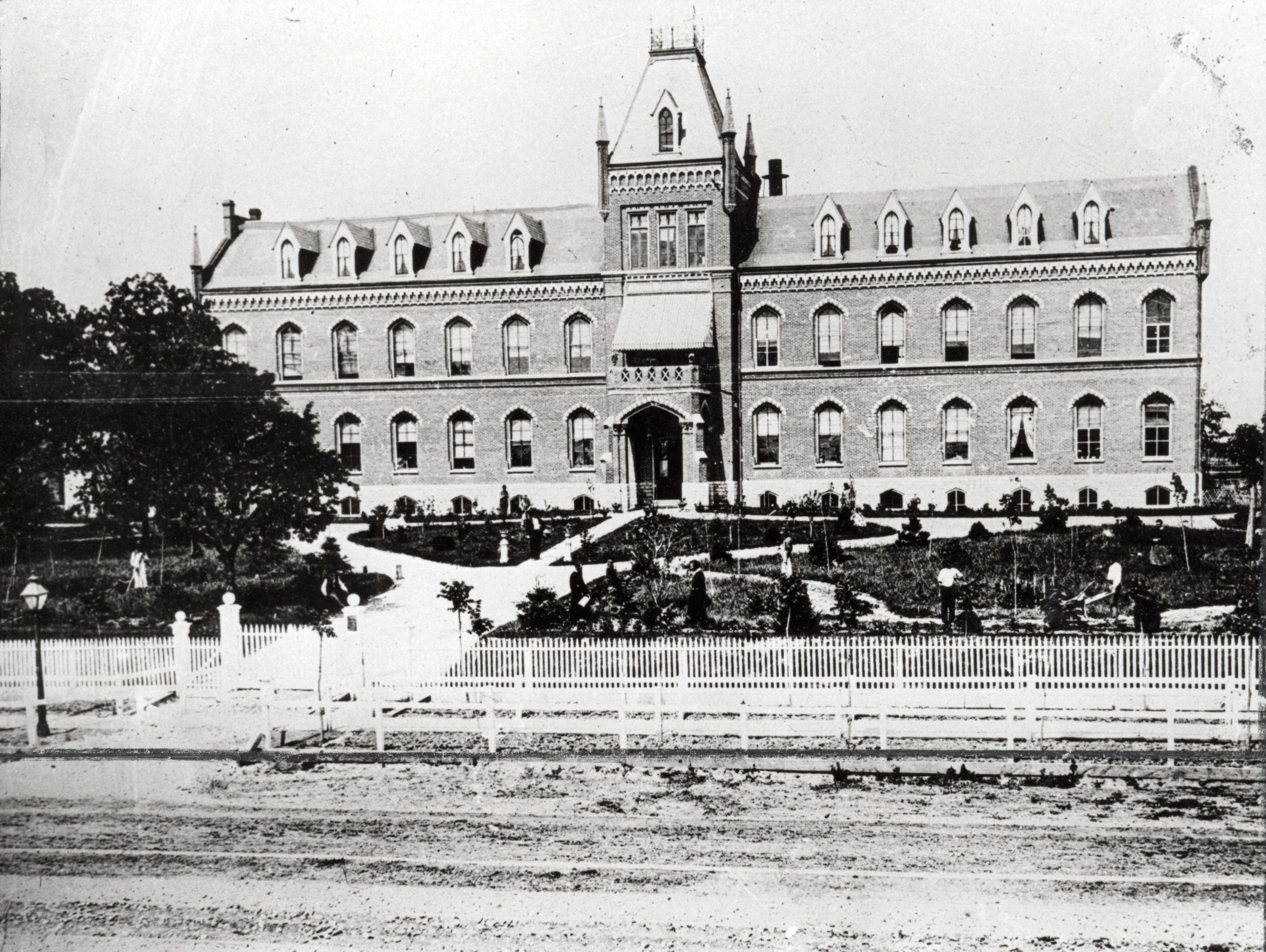
Alexian Brothers Hospital, 3933 South Broadway

Alexian Brothers Hospital was a Catholic hospital in St. Louis, Missouri, founded in 1869 by the Alexian Brothers, a healing order of Catholic men. In 1870, it began operation as a two-bed facility. In 1874, a larger building was erected. In 1890, a four-story main building was completed, with a fifth floor added in 1897. In 1909, the hospital became affiliated with St. Louis University.

Between 1928 and 1952, the hospital operated a training school for male nurses; it offered its services only to men until 1962. In 1979 the hospital was demolished and a new building was put in its place the same year. In 1997, the hospital began to be managed by the Sisters of Mercy. In 2000, it became known as St. Alexius Hospital under a sponsorship of St. Anthony's Medical Center It had previously been known as Alexian Brothers' Hospital or the Alexian Brothers' Hospital and Insane Asylum.

This hospital claimed to be the oldest American hospital west of the Mississippi River. (However, it is believed that the oldest hospital west of the Mississippi River was probably founded in 1828 by the Daughters of Charity and later became DePaul Health Center.) The hospital was located at 3933 South Broadway, about four miles south of the Gateway Arch and near the riverfront in south St. Louis. It also ran the Lutheran School of Nursing at 2639 Miami Street until it shut down in 2022. The hospital claimed that the novel and movie The Exorcist were partly inspired by a 12-week exorcism that took place at this location in 1949.

In 2004, the hospital was acquired by Argilla HealthCare, which became Envision Hospital Corporation after a merger. In 2008, Florida-based Success Healthcare bought the hospital. Various bankruptcies followed. Around 2020, the hospital was renamed South City Hospital. The hospital had a capacity of 178 beds at the time of its closing in 2023.
