= Regan MacNeil =

Fictional character from The Exorcist

- The Exorcist character
- Linda Blair as Regan MacNeil in the 1973 film The Exorcist
- First appearance: The Exorcist (1971 novel)
- Last appearance: The Exorcist: Believer (2023 film)
- Created by: William Peter Blatty
- Portrayed by: Linda Blair (films); Lydia Wilson (BBC Radio adaptation); Emily Yette (stage); Clare Louise Connolly (stage); Susannah Edgley (stage); Geena Davis (pre adult, television series); Sophie Thatcher (teenager, television series)

In-universe information
- Alias: Angela Rance (television series)
- Gender: Female
- Family: Chris MacNeil (mother); Howard MacNeil (father); Jamie MacNeil (older brother, deceased)
- Spouse: Henry Rance (television series)
- Children: Television series: Katherine "Kat" Rance (daughter); Casey Rance (daughter)
- Nationality: American
- Age: 12 (first film); 16 (second film); 62 (Believer)

Regan Teresa MacNeil (born April 6, 1959 (Note: Regan MacNeil's date of birth varies depending on which narrative is being referred to. In the novel, it is stated that Regan turns 12 on April 6. If we are to coincide the year the story is set with the year of the novel's publication (1971), then Regan's year of birth would be 1959. The main arc of the MacNeil family in the novel takes place from April 1 to May 16. There are forty days between Regan's birthday and the climactic exorcism. To indicate Regan's birthday in the context of the 1973 adaptation, one must look for certain visual clues and transpose the number of days to the next medium. In the adaptation, Chris MacNeil is seen walking home from the film set while children in Halloween costumes run past her. This implies that the date is at least October 31, 1973; analogous to the April 1 (April Fools Day) setting of the novel. Since the novel had Regan celebrating her 12th birthday five days after April 1, then the film has Regan celebrating her birthday five days after Halloween, which is November 5. Therefore her date of birth in the adaptation would be November 5, 1961.)) is a fictional character in the 1971 novel The Exorcist and one of the supporting characters in its 1973 film adaptation and the 1977 film Exorcist II: The Heretic, while being one of the main protagonists in the first season of the television series The Exorcist (2016–2017). She was portrayed by Linda Blair in both films and by Geena Davis in the television series. Blair reprised the role in the 2023 film The Exorcist: Believer.

== Character ==
Regan MacNeil is a 12-year-old girl and the daughter of actress Chris MacNeil (Ellen Burstyn). Regan is caught between her mother's grueling working schedule and the fact that her parents are in the process of an acrimonious divorce (her father is in Europe and is not seen in the film), and she had an older brother named Jamie, who died at the age of three because of an infection. She is named for the character of the same name in William Shakespeare's King Lear.

She is described as shy, even diffident, and it is not within her nature to behave aggressively. She is devoted to her mother, making clay animals as gifts for her and leaving a rose at her place at the kitchen table each morning. Chris is determined to be a good mother, spending all her off days with her. Because she is an atheist, she does not teach Regan about religion, although Chris' secretary Sharon Spencer (Kitty Winn) teaches Regan about the general ideas of Christianity without Chris' approval.

Even though Chris knows Regan very well, it takes her some time to realize that Regan's bizarre changes are not neurological. As soon as she accepts the idea of possession, she consults Fr. Damien Karras (Jason Miller) and begs him to evaluate Regan for an exorcism. While Karras is initially skeptical, he slowly becomes convinced that she is indeed possessed by the ancient demon Pazuzu, and eventually calls for an exorcism.

Karras and Father Lankester Merrin (Max Von Sydow) perform an exorcism and succeed in exorcising Pazuzu, albeit at the cost of their own lives. Regan retains no memory of her possession. Shortly afterwards, Chris and Regan decide to move. On the day of the move, Father Dyer (William O'Malley) visits their home and, upon seeing his clerical collar, Regan embraces him, implying she has not lost her memory.

In the sequel Exorcist II: The Heretic, which takes place four years after the events in The Exorcist, Regan is 16 years old, living in New York City and undergoing psychiatric therapy, claiming to remember nothing about her plight in Washington, D.C. while her psychiatrist believes her memories are only buried or repressed. As the story progresses, Regan is revealed to have psychic healing powers (the reason why the demon attacked her previously).

For The Exorcist III, Carolco Pictures had the idea of a grown-up Regan who gives birth to possessed twins, but it was abandoned, and the story was switched to Blatty's novel Legion instead. John Carpenter was asked to direct The Exorcist III but backed out when he realized William Peter Blatty really wanted to direct himself and because of creative differences.

Regan MacNeil appears in the television series The Exorcist. As an adult she changed her name to Angela Rance to escape the demons, but they find her again and attack her family, possessing her younger daughter Casey; she makes a deal with Pazuzu to allow him to possess her once again in order to save Casey's life. While possessing her, Pazuzu murders her mother, Chris. Regan, with the help of the priests Tomas Ortega and Marcus Keane, finds the strength to once again exorcise the demon from her body and soul, but he retaliates by breaking her back, rendering her paralyzed but still alive.

In December 2020, a reboot of The Exorcist was announced to be in the works from Blumhouse Productions. Ellen Burstyn was to reprise her role as Chris MacNeil, but Linda Blair wrote on Twitter that she had not been contacted to reprise her role of Regan MacNeil: "As of now, there has not been any discussions about me participating or reprising my role. I wish all those involved the best and I appreciate the loyalty and passion the fans have for The Exorcist and my character." However, Blair would go on to reprise the role in The Exorcist: Believer, which ignores the events of The Exorcist television series. In the film, Regan has become estranged from her mother Chris due to her becoming an expert on possession and exorcisms. At the end of the film, Regan and Chris are reunited.

== Portrayals ==
Actress April Winchell states that she was considered for the role until she developed pyelonephritis, which caused her to be hospitalized and ultimately dropped. Pamelyn Ferdin was a candidate for the role, but the producers may have felt she was too well-known. Denise Nickerson was also considered and offered the role, but her parents rejected it on her behalf after reading the film's script.

An adult Regan MacNeil appears in the television series The Exorcist, in which she is portrayed by Geena Davis.

== In popular culture ==
- In the Supernatural season 2 episode "The Usual Suspects", Linda Blair guest-stars as a police detective helping them against an apparent vengeful spirit. At the end of the episode, Dean Winchester comments that Linda's character looks familiar as he suddenly craves pea soup.
- In the 2001 comedy horror film Scary Movie 2, Regan and Pazuzu's characters are parodied in the prologue of the film in a satirical exorcism done by a parody of Father Karras and Father Merrin, portrayed by Andy Richter and James Woods, respectively.
- In the 2004 Flash game The Maze, also known as Scary Maze Game, by developer Jeremy Winterrowd, a publicity photo of Pazuzu-possessed Regan's face is used as a screamer in the final level.
