= Lawrence Kenny =

American priest (1896–1977)

Laurence J. Kenny (not Father Lawrence Kenny (August 19, 1896 - January 1977)

Father Laurence J. Kenny (October 12, 1864 Zaleski, Vinton County, OH, - December 28, 1958 Lemay, St. Louis County, MO), the son of Thomas Kenny and Margaret Hayes both from Ireland. Father Laurence J. Kenny was a Roman Catholic Jesuit priest who was the confessor to the exorcist Father William S. Bowdern.

Page 49 of Thomas Allen's "Possessed" Father Raymond Bishop "sought out Father Laurence J. Kenny, S.J., a man renowned for his warmth and wisdom. Kenny, who was in his nineties, had only recently retired as a professor of history. He was the confessor to many of the priests in the Jesuit community at the university."

He spent his adolescence studying at Saint Joseph's College in Bardstown, Kentucky, and Saint Xavier College in Cincinnati, Ohio until he entered the Jesuit novitiate at Florissant in 1883, at the age of 18. His period of religious formation included several years studying philosophy and science in Woodstock, Maryland, until 1890, when he began to teach at Saint Ignatius College in Chicago. He returned to Saint Louis to attend Saint Louis University and obtain his master's degree in 1895. In 1896, he studied for a time at Creighton University in Omaha, Nebraska before studying theology at the Saint Ignatius Mission in Montana, a mission founded by Jesuit Peter J. De Smet.

Ordained in 1900, he was one of the first to be ordained in Saint Francis Xavier (College) Church at Saint Louis University. Aside from a brief six-year stint teaching at the University of Detroit, he spent most of his adult life teaching history at the University, also serving at various times as registrar, prefect of discipline, and director of the history department. He possessed a great interest in the history of the University, and in genealogical research

Fr. Kenny spent the last year of his life at Mount Saint Rose Hospital where he died of coronary thrombosis from which he suffered for 8 years. He first was buried at St. Stanislaus Seminary Cemetery in Florissant, MO. After the seminary was sold his remains was removed to Calvary Cemetery, St. Louis City,
