= Joseph de Tonquedec =

French Jesuit priest and exorcist (1868–1962)

Joseph de Tonquédec, S.J. (December 27, 1868 – November 21, 1962) was a widely known Jesuit Roman Catholic priest and author.

Father Tonquédec was born in Morlaix, France on December 27, 1868. He received his doctorate in philosophy in 1899 and his doctorate in theology in 1905. He was the professor of philosophy at Collège St. Grégoire, Tours, from 1899 to 1901. He was the official exorcist of Paris from 1924 to 1962. Father Gabriele Amorth, in his 1994 memoir An Exorcist Tells His Story, cites Father de Tonquédec, referring to him as a "famous French exorcist."

Father de Tonquédec was an intellectual adversary of the French philosopher Maurice Blondel. His writings on theology, philosophy, and literature have been translated into languages including Italian, Spanish, Latin, and English; see, for example, his "Some Aspects of Satan's Activity in this World."

Tonquédec died on November 21, 1962, in France.

== Select Bibliography ==
- G. K. Chesterton, ses idées et son caractère. Paris: Nouvelle Librairie nationale, 1920.
- Deux études sur "La Pensée" de M. Maurice Blondel. La doctrine de la connaissance. La question du surnaturel. Avec un appendice sur le désir naturel de la vision de Dieu. Paris: Éditions Beauchesne, 1936. Reprinted as ISBN 9782701004549.
- Introduction à l'étude du merveilleux et du miracle. Paris: Éditions Beauchesne, 1938 (3e édition). Reprinted 2013; ISBN 9782701019871.
- Les maladies nerveuses ou mentales et les manifestations diaboliques. Paris: Éditions Beauchesne, 1938. Reprinted 1997; ISBN 9782701004556.
