= Raymond J. Bishop =

American priest and academic (1906–1978)

Raymond J. Bishop (January 15, 1906 – February 19, 1978) was a Catholic priest who was one of the several involved in the case of exorcising a boy in Maryland, who allegedly was possessed after using a ouija board. The case inspired author William Peter Blatty to write his 1971 novel The Exorcist.

== Life ==
In 1949, Father Bishop taught at Saint Louis University, where one of his female students asked for help concerning her 13-year-old cousin (for reasons of anonymity referred to by the pseudonym Robbie Mannheim), who she said had been experiencing supernatural attacks after playing with a ouija board, and who had gone through one unsuccessful exorcism. Bishop contacted his close friend, Father William S. Bowdern, and they performed another exorcism on the boy.

In the 1950s, Bishop was sent to Creighton University in Omaha, Nebraska, where he taught for more than 20 years. He died on February 19, 1978, in Nebraska.
