= Exorcism =

Evicting spiritual entities from a person or area

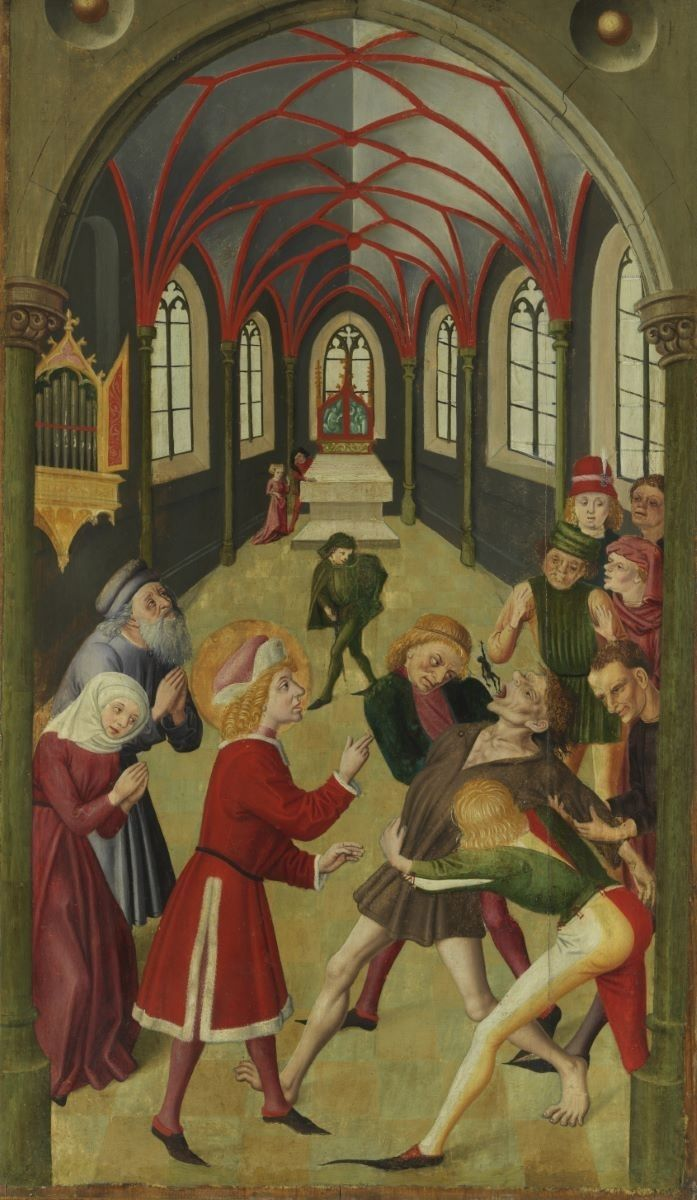
St. Guy Heals a Possessed Man (1474)

Exorcism (from Ancient Greek ἐξορκισμός (exorkismós) 'binding by oath') is the religious or spiritual practice of evicting malevolent spiritual entities from a person, or an area, that is believed to be possessed. Depending on the spiritual beliefs of the exorcist, this may be done by causing the entity to swear an oath, performing an elaborate ritual, or simply by commanding it to depart in the name of a higher power. The practice is ancient and part of the belief system of many cultures and religions.

== By religion ==
=== Buddhism ===
The practice of reciting or listening to the Paritta began very early in the history of Buddhism. It is a Buddhist practice of reciting certain verses and scriptures from Pali Canon in order to ward off misfortune or danger. The belief in the effective spiritual power to heal, or protect, of the Sacca-kiriyā, or asseveration of something quite true is an aspect of the work ascribed to the paritta. Several scriptures in the Paritta like Metta Sutta, Dhajagga Sutta, or Ratana Sutta can be recited for exorcism purposes, and Āṭānāṭiya Sutta is regarded as particularly effective.

==== Tibetan Buddhism ====
The ritual of the Exorcising-Ghost day is part of Tibetan tradition. The Tibetan religious ceremony 'Gutor' ༼དགུ་གཏོར་༽, literally offering of the 29th, is held on the 29th of the 12th Tibetan month, with its focus on driving out all negativity, including evil spirits and misfortunes of the past year, and starting the new year in a peaceful and auspicious way.

The temples and monasteries throughout Tibet hold grand religious dance ceremonies, with the largest at Potala Palace in Lhasa. Families clean their houses on this day, decorate the rooms and eat a special noodle soup called 'Guthuk'. ༼དགུ་ཐུག་༽ In the evening, the people carry torches, calling out the words of exorcism.

=== Christianity ===
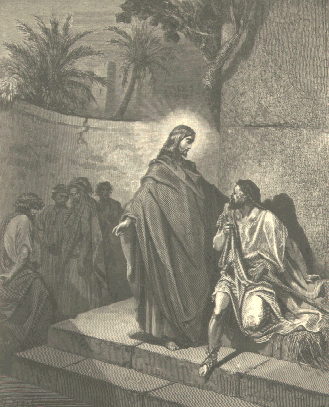
Exorcising a Mute by Gustave Doré, 1865

In Christianity, exorcism is the practice of casting out or getting rid of demons. In Christian practice, the person performing the exorcism, known as an exorcist, is a member of a Christian Church, or an individual thought to be graced with special powers or skills. The exorcist may use prayers and religious material, such as set formulae, gestures, symbols, sacred images, sacramentals, etc. The exorcist often invokes God, Jesus or several different angels and archangels to intervene with the exorcism. Protestant Christian exorcists most commonly believe the authority given to them by the Father, Son, and Holy Spirit (the Trinity) is the sole source of their ability to cast out demons.

In general, people considered to be possessed are not regarded as evil unto themselves, nor wholly responsible for their actions, because possession is considered to be the unwilling manipulation by a demon resulting in harm to self or others. Therefore, practitioners regard exorcism as more of a cure than a punishment. The mainstream rituals usually take this into account, making sure that there is no violence to the possessed, only that they be tied down if there is potential for violence.

Requested and performed exorcisms began to decline in the United States by the 18th century, and occurred rarely until the latter half of the 20th century when the public saw a sharp rise due to the media attention exorcisms received. There was "a 50% increase in the number of exorcisms performed between the early 1960s and the mid-1970s".

==== Catholicism ====
In Catholicism, exorcisms are performed in the name of Jesus Christ. There is a distinction between major exorcisms and minor exorcisms. Minor exorcisms are included in some blessings in which priests create sacramentals, such as blessed salt, and are also found in the ritual Scrutinies of the catechumens. A related practice is deliverance ministry. The distinction between deliverance ministry and exorcism is that exorcism is conducted by priests given special permission from the Catholic Church, while deliverance ministry is prayer for people who are distressed and wish to heal emotional wounds, including those purportedly caused by evil spirits.

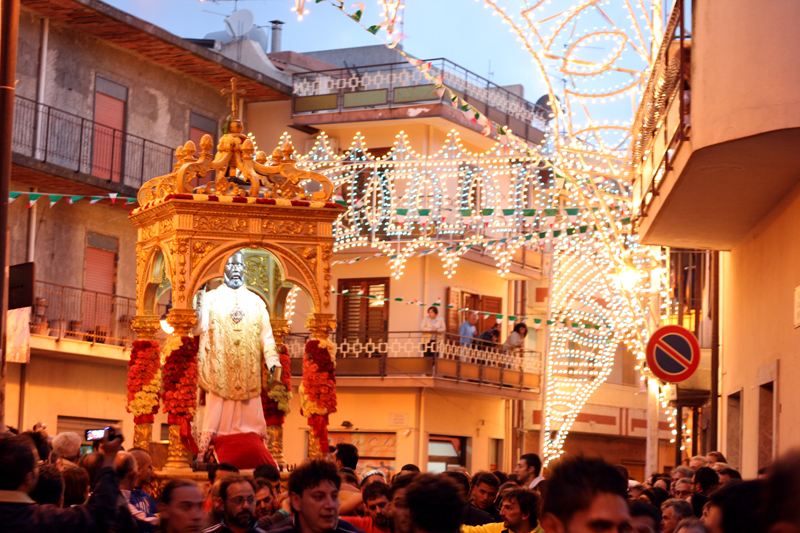
The statue of Saint Philip of Agira with the Gospel in his left hand, the symbol of the exorcists, in the May celebrations in his honor at Limina, Sicily

The Catholic rite for a formal exorcism, called a "Major Exorcism", is given in Section 11 of the Rituale Romanum. The Ritual lists guidelines for conducting an exorcism and determining when a formal exorcism is required. Priests are instructed to carefully determine that the nature of the condition is not actually a psychological or physical illness before proceeding. The United States Conference of Catholic Bishops state on their website: "the actual determination of whether a member of the faithful is genuinely possessed by the devil is made by the Church."

In Catholic practice, the person performing the exorcism, known as an exorcist, must be an ordained priest. The exorcist recites prayers according to the rubrics of the rite, and makes use of religious materials such as icons, sacramentals (e.g. holy water), and holy relics. The exorcist invokes God—specifically the Name of Jesus Christ—as well as the Most Blessed Virgin Mary, saints of the Church Triumphant and the Archangel Michael to intervene with the exorcism. According to Catholic understanding, several weekly exorcisms over many years are sometimes required to expel a deeply entrenched demon.

Saint Michael's Prayer against Satan and the Rebellious Angels, attributed to Pope Leo XIII, is considered the strongest prayer of the Catholic Church against cases of diabolic possession. The Holy Rosary also has an exorcistic and intercessory power.

==== Eastern Orthodoxy ====
The Eastern Orthodox Church has a rich and complex tradition of exorcism. The practice is traced to biblical accounts of Jesus expelling demons and exhorting his apostles to "cast out devils". The church views demonic possession as the devil's primary means of enslaving humanity and rebelling against God. Orthodox Christians believe objects, as well as individuals, can be possessed.

As in other Christian churches, Orthodox exorcists expel demons by invoking God through the name of Jesus Christ. Unlike the Roman Catholic Church, all priests of the Orthodox Church are trained and equipped to perform exorcisms, particularly for the sacrament of baptism. Like their Catholic counterparts, Orthodox priests learn to distinguish demonic possession from mental illness, namely by observing whether the subject reacts negatively to holy relics or places. All Orthodox liturgical books include prayers of exorcism, namely by Saint Basil and Saint John Chrysostom.

Orthodox theology takes a uniquely expansive view of exorcism, believing every Christian undertakes exorcism through their struggle against sin and evil:

The whole Church, past, present and future, has the task of an exorcist to banish sin, evil, injustice, spiritual death, the devil from the life of humanity ... Both healing and exorcising are ministered through prayers, which spring from faith in God and from love for man ... All the prayers of healing and exorcism, composed by the Fathers of the Church and in use since the third century, begin with the solemn declaration: In Thy Name, O Lord.

Additionally, many Orthodox Christians subscribe to the superstition of Vaskania, or the "evil eye", in which those harboring intense jealousy and envy towards others can bring harm to them (akin to a curse) and are, in effect, demonically possessed by these negative emotions. This belief is most likely rooted in pre-Christian paganism, and although the church rejects the notion that the evil eye can have such power, it does recognize the phenomenon as morally and spiritually undesirable and thus a target for exorcism.

==== Lutheran Churches ====
From the 16th century onward, Lutheran pastoral handbooks describe the primary symptoms of demonic possession to be knowledge of secret things, knowledge of languages one has never learned, and supernatural strength. Before conducting a major exorcism, Lutheran liturgical texts state that a physician be consulted in order to rule out any medical or psychiatric illness. The rite of exorcism centers chiefly around driving out demons "with prayers and contempt" and includes the Apostles' Creed and the Lord's Prayer.

Baptismal liturgies in Lutheran Churches include a minor exorcism.

==== The Church of Jesus Christ of Latter-day Saints ====
While a very rare practice in the Church, there are two methods for performing an exorcism. The first is by anointing with consecrated oil and laying on of hands followed by a blessing on a specific person and commanding the spirit to leave. The second and most common method is done by "raising the hand to the square" and then "commanding the spirit away in the name of Jesus Christ and with the power or authority of the Melchizedek priesthood". Exorcisms can only be performed by someone holding the Melchizedek priesthood, the higher of the two priesthoods of the Church, and can be performed by anyone holding that priesthood, however they are generally performed by bishops, missionaries, mission presidents, or stake presidents. Exorcisms are not recorded by the Church and therefore the number of exorcisms performed in the religion are unknown.

Demonic possession is rarely talked about in the church. Demonic possession has been talked about twice by Joseph Smith, the founder of the faith. The first time refers to his experience during the First Vision and he recorded the following in his "1831 account of the First Vision":

I kneeled down and began to offer up the desires of my heart to God, I had scarcely done so, when immediately I was seized upon by some power which entirely overcame me and had such astonishing influence over me as to bind my tongue so that I could not speak. Thick darkness gathered around me and it seemed to me for a time as if I were doomed to sudden destruction. But exerting all my powers to call upon God to deliver me out of the power of this enemy which had seized upon me, and at the very moment when I was ready to sink into despair and abandon myself to destruction, not to an imaginary ruin but to the power of some actual being from the unseen world who had such a marvelous power as I had never before felt in any being, just at this moment of great alarm I saw a pillar of light exactly over my head above the brightness of the sun, which descended gradually until it fell upon me.

His second experience comes from a journal entry in which he talks about the time he performed an exorcism on a friend.

=== Hinduism ===
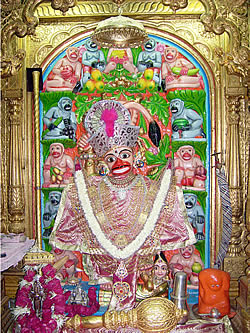
The image of Lord Hanuman at the Hanuman temple in Sarangpur is said to be so powerful that its gaze drives evil spirits out of victims.

In many Hindu traditions, people can be possessed by bhootas, pretas or pisachas, restless and often malignant beings roughly analogous to ghosts, and to a lesser extent, demons.

Of four Vedas, or holy books, of Hinduism, the Atharva Veda is most focused on knowledge such as exorcism, magic, and alchemy. The basic means of exorcism are the mantra (a sacred utterance of certain phonemes or phrases that is often connected to a particular deity) and the yajna (a sacrifice, offering, or ritual done before a sacred fire). These are performed in accordance with Vedic traditions as well as the Tantra, the later esoteric teachings and practices within Hinduism.

Within the dominant Hindu sect of Vaishnava, which reveres Vishnu as the supreme being, exorcisms are performed by reciting the names of Narasimha, a fierce avatar of Vishnu that seeks to destroy evil and restore Dharma, or by reading the Bhagavata Purana, a highly revered text that tells the story of good vanquishing evil. Another resource for exorcisms is the Garuda Purana, a vast corpus of literature mostly centered on Vishnu, deals heavily with topics related to death, disease, good versus evil, and spiritual health.

The devotional hymn known as Hanuman Chalisa advises conducting exorcisms by praying to Lord Hanuman, the most devoted follower of Rama, a major Hindu deity. As according to a chaupai (couplet) (भूत पिशाच निकट नहिं आवै। महावीर जब नाम सुनावै॥) of this hymn, merely uttering Hanuman's name terrifies evil spirits into leaving the possessed. Some Hindu temples, most notably the Mehandipur Balaji Temple in Rajasthan, host exorcism rituals that invoke incarnations of Hanuman.

=== Islam ===
Terms for exorcism practices include ṭard (or dafʿ) al-shayṭān/al-jinn (expulsion of the demon/the spirit), ʿilāj (treatment), and ibrāʾ al-maṣrūʿ (curing the possessed), but also ruḳya (enchantment or cleansing) is used to exorcise various spirits.

The Islamic prophet Muhammad taught his followers to read the last three suras from the Quran, Surat al-Ikhlas (Sincerity), Surat al-Falaq (The Dawn) and Surat an-Nas (Mankind). The permissibility of exorcism, as well as models for its practice, can be traced to Hadiths reporting Muhammad and Jesus performing exorcism rites.

Islamic exorcisms might consist of the treated person lying down, while a sheikh places a hand on a patient's head and recites verses from the Quran, but this is not mandatory. The drinking or sprinkling of holy water (water from the Zamzam Well) may also take place along with applying of clean, non-alcohol-based perfumes, called attar. Specific verses from the Quran are recited that glorify God (e.g., The Throne Verse (Arabic: آية الكرسي, romanized: Ayatul Kursi)) and invoke God's help. In some cases, the adhan (call for daily prayers) is also read, as this has the effect of repelling non-angelic unseen beings or the jinn.

According to a study by Alean Al-Krenawi and John Graham, the process of Quranic healing in order to exorcise spirits can be divided into three stages:

1. Removing any (haram) distractions, such as music instruments, amulets (tabiz) and golden jewelry. All pictures in the room that (it is believed) would allow angels to enter are removed. The healer then tells the client and the family that everything happens by God's will and that he is merely a mediator, also mentioning that other forms of healing, such as by sorcery, are not acceptable to Islam.
2. The healer determines if the client is possessed or not and tries to enter a dialogue with the spirit. The healer might ask the spirit about type (Zar ("red wind"), Arwah (ghosts), jinn (genii), shayatin (devils), div (demons)), religion, sex or reason for possession. He also asks the client, not the spirit, about dreams and feelings involved in the dream. After that, the healer cleans himself, the room, and asks the people in the room to do the same.
3. The actual exorcism begins by reciting Quranic verses such as Al-Fatiha, Al-Baqara, Al-Baqara 255, Al-Jinn and three Qul (Al-Ikhlas, An-Nas and Al-Falaq), depending on the type of spirit. Other treatments include using honey and water, as a purification ritual to clean the soul and body from sins.

=== Judaism ===
Josephus reports exorcisms performed by administering poisonous root extracts and others by making sacrifices.

In more recent times, Rabbi Yehuda Fetaya (1859–1942) authored the book Minchat Yahuda, which deals extensively with exorcism, his experience with possessed people, and other subjects of Jewish thought. The book is written in Hebrew and was translated into English.

The Jewish exorcism ritual is performed by a rabbi who has mastered Kabbalah. Also present is a minyan (a group of ten adult males), who gather in a circle around the possessed person. The group recites Psalm 91 three times, and then the rabbi blows a shofar (a ram's horn).

The shofar is blown in a certain way, with various notes and tones, in effect to "shatter the body" so that the possessing force will be shaken loose. After it has been shaken loose, the rabbi begins to communicate with it and ask it questions such as why it is possessing the body of the possessed. The minyan may pray for it and perform a ceremony for it in order to enable it to feel safe, and so that it can leave the person's body.

=== Sikhism ===
Sikhs do not have a belief in demonic possession. Therefore, exorcism is considered a violation of Sikh Code of Conduct.

=== Taoism and Chinese folk religion ===
In Taoism, exorcisms are performed when an individual has been possessed by an evil spirit for one of two reasons: The victim has disturbed a ghost, regardless of intent, and the ghost now seeks revenge, or the victim has been targeted by someone using black magic to conjure a ghost to possess them. The Fashi, who are both Chinese ritual specialists and Taoist priests, are able to conduct particular rituals for exorcism. These rituals will vary between the many sects which are further influenced by the geographic region in which the specific Taoist is from. A Zheng Yi sect Taoist in Beijing may conduct a ritual completely different from a Taoist of the same sect in a southern area such as Hong Kong.

For example, the leaders of these exorcism rituals who are tangki that invited the divine powers from the Deities and conduct a dramatic performance to call out against the demons so the village can once again have peace. The leaders strike themselves with various sharp weapons to show their invincibility to ward off the demons and also to let out their blood. This form of blood is considered to be sacred and powerful, so after the rituals, the blood is blotted with talismans and placed on the door of houses as an act of spiritual protection against evil spirits. Such ritual using blood however is more common among folk sects such as LuShan, and does not take place in more orthodox sects such as QuanZhen or Zheng Yi who are more monastic in nature. However, it is possible that folk Taoists in rural areas descended from orthodox sects may be influenced by local folk religions, so it may be seen.

Historically, all Taoist exorcisms include usage of Fulu, chanting, physical gesture like mudras, and praying as a way to drive away the spirit is common in all sects.

== Scientific view ==
Demonic possession is not a psychiatric or medical diagnosis recognized by either the DSM-5 or the ICD-10. Those who profess a belief in demonic possession have sometimes ascribed to possession the symptoms associated with physical or mental illnesses, such as hysteria, mania, psychosis, Tourette's syndrome, epilepsy, schizophrenia or dissociative identity disorder.

Additionally, there is a form of monomania called demonomania or demonopathy in which the patient believes that they are possessed by one or more demons. According to psychological literature, exorcism may work on people experiencing symptoms of possession by way of placebo effect and the power of suggestion. Some cases suggest that supposedly possessed persons act as such in order to gain attention due to other medical conditions, such as low self-esteem.

Within the scientific community, the work of psychiatrist M. Scott Peck, a believer in exorcism, generated significant debate and derision. Much was made of his association with (and admiration for) the controversial Malachi Martin, a Roman Catholic exorcist, despite the fact that Peck consistently called Martin a liar and a manipulator. Other criticisms leveled against Peck included claims that he had transgressed the boundaries of professional ethics by attempting to persuade his patients to accept Christianity.

=== Exorcism and mental illness ===
One scholar has described psychosurgery as "Neurosurgical Exorcisms", with trepanation having been widely used to release demons from the brain. Meanwhile, another scholar has equated psychotherapy with exorcism.

==== United Kingdom ====
In the UK, the numbers of exorcisms performed were increasing as of 2017. A Church of England think tank, Theos, stated that the exorcisms mostly took place in charismatic and Pentecostal churches, and also among communities of West African origin. Frequently, the people exorcised were people with mental health problems, who often stopped taking their medications in response to the exorcism. The report described the exorcism as a "well-meaning initiative with the potential for serious harm" with the risk of constituting "psychological abuse".

== Anthropological view ==
Religious figures would have been presented with an individual and based their diagnosis of possession upon their own knowledge, which would be based on religious understandings. The occurrence of a possession has similar characteristics to someone experiencing a mental illness. This includes characteristics such as an abrupt change in behaviour and demeanor, loss of faith, thoughts of being chosen by a demonic power, experiences in seeing and hearing evil entities, and persistent fear of demonic forces. These are deemed as unfavorable within religious influence, therefore are treated and diagnosed within religious collectives, as illness.

However, not all possessions were deemed as negative: possessions occurring among the higher classes typically went untreated as they were said to be undertaken by benevolent spirits upholding social order, whereas possessions experienced by the powerless were considered as expressing anti-hegemonic sentiment and needed to be treated immediately.

This reflects a style of dichotomy that establishes spiritual possession as an illness which is socially mediated, and reflective of the social climate in which it is produced. Exorcisms are performed in response to spiritual possessions which cause distress or are found to be challenging the status quo and/or hegemonic values within the individual; otherwise, possessions are treated as holy communication from deities. These illnesses/possessions are culturally constructed as either psychological or spiritual. Spiritual possession and exorcism come as a pair, representative of social expectations of 'normal' functioning, and can often be engaged as a tool to challenge or maintain religious collective values.

The Catholic Church, for example, enters a relationship with the victims of spiritual possession akin to the Shamanistic Complex. The victim also represents what Nancy Scheper Hughes would call the 'individual body', that is, the victims' personal belief system as a Christian would assist in the healing process. In the sense that their belief that there is a demon within their body and that through the power of Christ the demon can be removed, creates a diagnosis and cure for this illness. A non-Christian may respond differently to this healing process. A non-Christian most likely would not even seek out religious intervention based on their symptoms, they would believe them to from a different illness, and would not find an exorcism an effective treatment.

The Shamanistic Complex gives a possible explanation as to what makes an exorcism effective or can increase the effectiveness. Exorcism exists within a realm of cultural healing practices, social processes that are informed by social norms. This much is true of most other healing practices, inclusive of those focussed on spiritual, psychological, and physical health. As such the systems set out by religious communities, like the Catholic Church, to diagnose and combat spiritual possession as a disease, as only effective as the psychological belief within these aspects.

== Notable exorcisms and exorcists in history ==
- (1578) Martha Brossier was a young woman who was made infamous around the year of 1578 for her feigned demonic possession discovered through exorcism proceedings.
- (1619) Mademoiselle Elizabeth de Ranfaing, who having become a widow in 1617 was later sought in marriage by a physician (afterwards burned under judicial sentence for being a practicing magician). After being rejected, he gave her potions to make her love him which occasioned strange developments in her health and proceeded to continuously give her some other forms of medicament. The maladies which she had were incurable by the various physicians that attended her and eventually led to a recourse of exorcisms as prescribed by several physicians that examined her case. They began to exorcise her in September, 1619. During the exorcisms, the demon that possessed her purportedly made detailed and fluid responses in varying languages including French, Greek, Latin, Hebrew and Italian and was able to know and recite the thoughts and sins of various individuals who examined her. She was further also purported to describe in detail with the use of various languages the rites and secrets of the church to experts in the languages she spoke. There was even a mention of how the demon interrupted an exorcist, who after making a mistake in his recital of an exorcism rite in Latin, corrected his speech and mocked him.
- (1778) George Lukins
- (1842–1844) Johann Blumhardt performed the exorcism of Gottliebin Dittus over a two-year period in Möttlingen, Germany, from 1842 to 1844. Pastor Blumhardt's parish subsequently experienced growth marked by confession and healing, which he attributed to the successful exorcism.
- (1906) Clara Germana Cele was a South African school girl who claimed to be possessed.
- (1947) Art expert Armando Ginesi claims Salvador Dalí received an exorcism from Italian friar Gabriele Maria Berardi while he was in France. Dalí would have created a sculpture of Christ on the cross that he would have given to the friar in thanks.
- (1949) A boy identified as Robbie Mannheim was the subject of an exorcism in 1949, which became the chief inspiration for The Exorcist, a horror novel and movie written by William Peter Blatty, who heard about the case while he was a student in the class of 1950 at Georgetown University. Robbie was taken into the care of Rev. Luther Miles Schulze, the boy's Lutheran pastor, after psychiatric and medical doctors were unable to explain the disturbing events associated with the teen; the minister then referred the boy to Rev. Edward Hughes, who performed the first exorcism on the teen. The subsequent exorcism was partially performed in both Cottage City, Maryland, and Bel-Nor, Missouri, by Father William S. Bowdern, S.J., Father Raymond Bishop S.J. and a then Jesuit scholastic Fr. Walter Halloran, S.J.
- (1974) Michael Taylor
- (1975) Anneliese Michel was a Catholic woman from Germany who was said to be possessed by six or more demons and subsequently underwent a secret, ten-month-long voluntary exorcism. Two movies, The Exorcism of Emily Rose and Requiem, are loosely based on Anneliese's story. The documentary movie Exorcism of Anneliese Michel (in Polish, with English subtitles) features the original audio tapes from the exorcism. The two priests and her parents were convicted of negligent manslaughter for failing to call a medical doctor to address her eating disorder as she died weighing only 68 pounds (31 kg). The case has been labelled a misidentification of mental illness, negligence, abuse, and religious hysteria.
- Bobby Jindal, former governor of Louisiana, wrote an essay in 1994 about his personal experience of performing an exorcism on an intimate friend named "Susan" while in college.
- Mother Teresa allegedly underwent an exorcism late in life under the direction of the Archbishop of Calcutta, Henry D'Souza, after he noticed she seemed to be extremely agitated in her sleep and feared she "might be under the attack of the evil one."
- (2005) The Tanacu exorcism is a case in which a mentally ill Romanian nun was killed during an exorcism by priest Daniel Petre Corogeanu. The case inspired the movies Beyond the Hills and The Crucifixion.
- The October 2007 mākutu lifting (ceremonial lifting of a sorcery or witchcraft curse) in the Wellington, New Zealand, suburb of Wainuiomata led to a death by drowning of a woman and the hospitalization of a teen. Five family members were convicted and sentenced to non-custodial sentences.

== See also ==
- Banishing
- Deal with the Devil
- Demon hunter
- Gay exorcism
- International Association of Exorcists
- Kecak
- List of exorcists
- Of Exorcisms and Certain Supplications
- Obsession (Spiritism)
- Phurba
- Sak Yant
- Spiritual warfare
- True name
- Yaktovil
- Yoruba religion
