= Exorcism of Roland Doe =

Series of exorcisms on an anonymous boy

In the late 1940s, in the United States, priests of the Catholic Church performed a series of exorcisms on an anonymous boy, documented under the pseudonym "Roland Doe" or "Robbie Mannheim". The 14-year-old boy was a victim of alleged demonic possession, and the events were recorded by the attending priest, Raymond J. Bishop. Subsequent supernatural claims surrounding the events were used as elements in William Peter Blatty's 1971 novel The Exorcist. In December 2021, The Skeptical Inquirer reported the true identity of Roland Doe/Robbie Mannheim as Ronald Edwin Hunkeler (June 1, 1935 – May 10, 2020).

== Origin of claims ==
In mid-1949, several newspaper articles printed anonymous reports of an alleged possession and exorcism. The source for these reports is thought to be the family's former pastor, Luther Miles Schulze. According to one account, a total of "forty-eight people witnessed this exorcism, nine of them Jesuits."

According to author Thomas B. Allen, Jesuit priest Father Walter H. Halloran was one of the last surviving eyewitnesses of the events and participated in the exorcism. Allen wrote that a diary kept by attending priest Father Raymond J. Bishop detailed the exorcism performed on the pseudonymously identified "Roland Doe" aka "Robbie". Speaking in 2013, Allen "emphasized that definitive proof that the boy known only as 'Robbie' was possessed by malevolent spirits is unattainable." According to Allen, Halloran also "expressed his skepticism about potential paranormal events before his death." When asked in an interview to make a statement verifying that the boy had actually been demonically possessed, Halloran responded saying, "No, I can't go on record. I never made an absolute statement about the things because I didn't feel I was qualified."

== Early life ==
Roland was born into a German Lutheran family in 1935. During the 1940s the family lived in Cottage City, Maryland. According to Allen, Roland was an only child and depended upon adults in his household for playmates, primarily his Aunt Harriet. His aunt, who was a spiritualist, introduced Roland to the ouija board when he expressed interest in it.

== Exorcisms ==
According to Thomas B. Allen, after Aunt Harriet's death the family experienced strange noises, furniture moving of its own accord and ordinary objects such as vases flying or levitating when the boy was nearby. The family turned to their Lutheran pastor, Luther Miles Schulze, for help. Long interested in parapsychology, Schulze arranged for the boy to spend a night in his home in order to observe him. When parapsychologist Joseph Banks Rhine learned that Schulze claimed he witnessed household objects and furniture seemingly moving by themselves, Rhine "wondered if Schulze 'unconsciously exaggerated' some of the facts." Schulze advised the boy's parents to "see a Catholic priest".

According to the traditional story, the boy then underwent a number of exorcisms. Edward Hughes, a Roman Catholic priest, conducted an exorcism on Roland at Georgetown University Hospital, a Jesuit institution. During the exorcism, the boy allegedly slipped one of his hands out of the restraints, broke a bedspring from under the mattress, and used it as an impromptu weapon, slashing the priest's arm and resulting in the exorcism ritual being halted.

After the failed exorcisms, additional incidents occurred including unexplained scratches on Roland’s body. The boy’s mother, a native of St. Louis, Missouri, desperately sought opportunities for a change of scenery. Upon seeing the word ‘LOUIS’ appear in the scratches on the boy’s rib cage, the family resolved to travel to St. Louis. The family stayed at a relative’s home in the inner-belt suburb of Bel-Nor. During their stay, Roland's cousin contacted one of their professors at Saint Louis University, Bishop, who in turn spoke to William S. Bowdern, an associate of College Church. Together, both priests visited Roland in his relatives' home, where they allegedly observed a shaking bed, flying objects, and the boy speaking in a guttural voice and exhibiting an aversion to anything sacred. Bowdern was granted permission from the archbishop to perform another exorcism. The exorcism took place at the Alexian Brothers Hospital in South St. Louis, later called South City Hospital, which closed its doors in 2023.

Before the next exorcism ritual began, another priest, Walter Halloran, was called to the psychiatric wing of the hospital, where he was asked to assist Bowdern. William Van Roo, a third Jesuit priest, was also there to assist. Halloran stated that during this scene words such as "evil" and "hell", along with other various marks, appeared on the teenager's body. Allegedly, during the Litany of the Saints portion of the exorcism ritual, the boy's mattress began to shake. Moreover, Roland broke Halloran's nose during the process. Halloran told a reporter that after the rite was over, the anonymous subject of the exorcism went on to lead "a rather ordinary life."

== Investigations and explanations ==
In his 1993 book Possessed: The True Story of an Exorcism, author Thomas B. Allen offered "the consensus of today's experts" that "Robbie was just a deeply disturbed boy, nothing supernatural about him".

Although Allen's Possessed has been criticized by Mark Opsasnick, who wrote that it contained questionable or inaccurate material, such as misidentifying the location as Mount Rainier, Maryland, rather than Cottage City, Maryland. Author Mark Opsasnick questioned many of the supernatural claims associated with this story, proposing that "Roland Doe" was simply a spoiled, disturbed bully who threw deliberate tantrums to get attention or to get out of school. Opsasnick reports that Halloran, who was present at the exorcism, never heard the boy's voice change, and he thought the boy merely mimicked Latin words he heard clergymen say, rather than gaining a sudden ability to speak Latin. Opsasnick reported that when marks were found on the boy's body, Halloran failed to check the boy's fingernails to see if he had made the marks himself. Opsasnick also questioned the story of Hughes' attempts to exorcise the boy and his subsequent injury, saying he could find no evidence that such an episode had actually occurred.

During his investigation Opsasnick discovered:

- The exorcism did not take place at 3210 Bunker Hill Road in Mount Rainier, Maryland
- The boy never lived in Mount Rainier
- The boy's home was in Cottage City, Maryland
- Much of the commonly accepted information about this story is based on hearsay, is not documented, and was never fact-checked
- There is no evidence Father E. Albert Hughes visited the boy's home, had him admitted to Georgetown Hospital, requested that the boy be restrained at the hospital, attempted an exorcism of the boy at Georgetown Hospital, or was injured by the boy during an exorcism (or at any other time)
- There is ample evidence refuting claims that Father Hughes suffered an emotional breakdown and disappeared from the Cottage City community

According to Opsasnick, individuals connected to the incident were influenced by their own specializations:

To psychiatrists, Rob Doe suffered from mental illness. To priests this was a case of demonic possession. To writers and film/video producers this was a great story to exploit for profit. Those involved saw what they were trained to see. Each purported to look at the facts but just the opposite was true — in actuality they manipulated the facts and emphasized information that fit their own agendas.

Opsasnik wrote that after he located and spoke with neighbors and childhood friends of the boy (most of whom he only referenced by initials) he concluded that "the boy had been a very clever trickster, who had pulled pranks to frighten his mother and to fool children in the neighborhood".

Skeptic Joe Nickell wrote that there was "simply no credible evidence to suggest the boy was possessed by demons or evil spirits" and maintains that the symptoms of possession can be "childishly simple" to fake. Nickell dismissed suggestions that supernatural forces made scratches or markings or caused words to appear on the teenager's body in unreachable places, saying, "A determined youth, probably even without a wall mirror, could easily have managed such a feat - if it actually occurred. Although the scratched messages proliferated, they never again appeared on a difficult-to-reach portion of the boy's anatomy." On one occasion the boy was reportedly seen scratching the words "hell" and "christ" on his chest by using his own fingernails. According to Nickell:

Nothing that was reliably reported in the case was beyond the abilities of a teenager to produce. The tantrums, "trances", moved furniture, hurled objects, automatic writing, superficial scratches, and other phenomena were just the kinds of things someone of R's age could accomplish, just as others have done before and since. Indeed, the elements of "poltergeist phenomena", "spirit communication", and "demonic possession"—taken both separately and, especially, together, as one progressed to the other—suggest nothing so much as role-playing involving trickery.

Nickell also dismissed stories of the boy's prodigious strength, saying he showed "nothing more than what could be summoned by an agitated teenager" and criticized popular accounts of the exorcism for what he termed a "stereotypical storybook portrayal" of the Devil.

== Religious perspectives ==
Two Christian academics, Terry D. Cooper, a professor of psychology, and Cindy K. Epperson, a professor of sociology, wrote that advocates of possession believe that "although they are not frequent, exorcisms are necessary for casting out the demonic" and "cases of genuine possession cannot be explained by psychiatry". Cooper and Epperson devoted a chapter of their book Evil: Satan, Sin, and Psychology to the case and dismissed natural explanations in favor of a supernatural perspective regarding the nature of evil.

== Literature and film ==
This exorcism case inspired the 1971 novel The Exorcist by William Peter Blatty, which in turn was adapted into the 1973 horror film of the same title. The case also inspired the 2000 movie Possessed, which is said to be closer to the story in Allen's book. A documentary was made of the case, titled In the Grip of Evil. Another documentary film was made in 2010 titled The Haunted Boy: The Secret Diary of the Exorcist, where a group of investigators travels to the location in question and uncovers the diary that is said to be kept by William S. Bowdern.

The Season 8 episode 7 of Ghost Adventures investigated the 1949 house. Bowdern's actual Great Niece refused to ever set foot back in the house due to the demonic force still in there.

In Criminal Minds Season 4, Episode 17 "Demonology," during an odd investigation into a few crimes, Agent Rossi mentions Robbie and the exorcisms to Agent Prentiss.
