= Edward Hughes (exorcist) =

American Catholic priest and exorcist

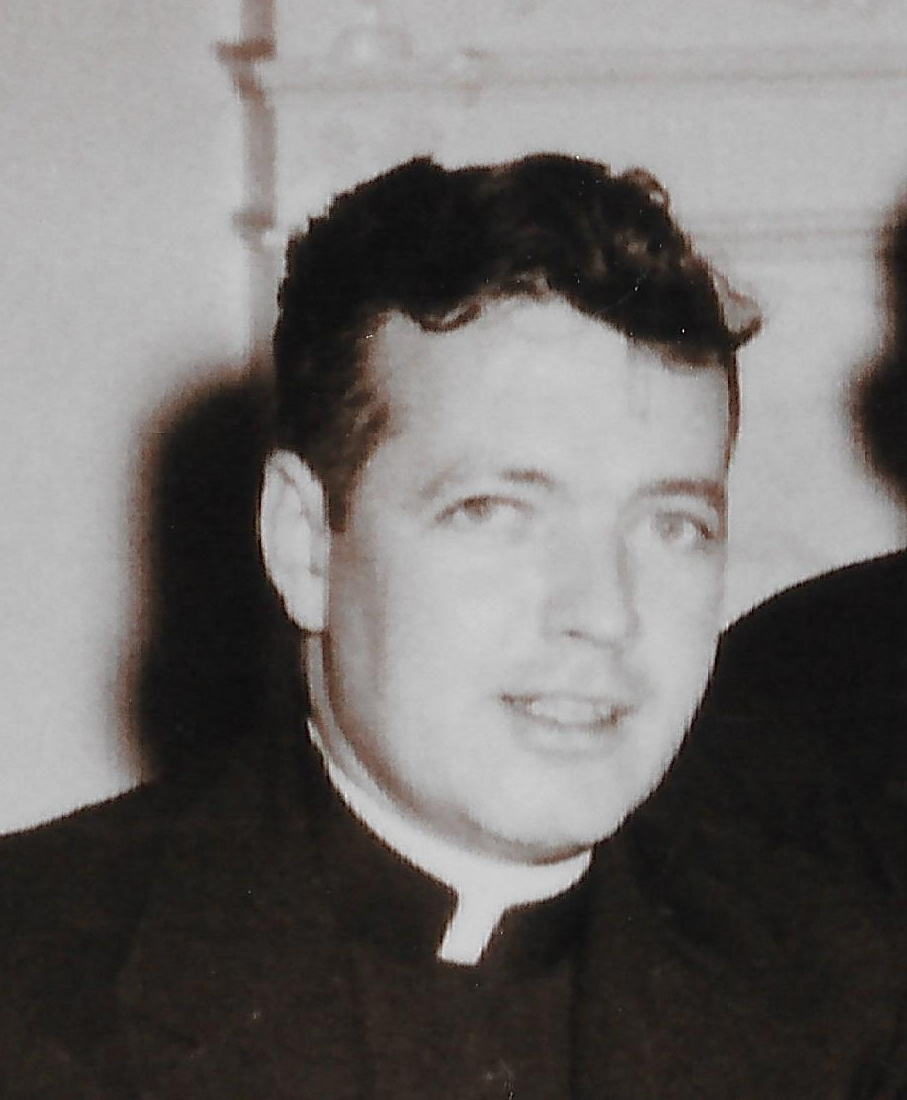
Edward Albert Hughes

Father Edward Albert Hughes (August 28, 1918 – October 12, 1980) was a Roman Catholic priest who served as an assistant pastor from June 16, 1948, to June 18, 1960, at St. James Church in Mt. Rainier, Maryland. He was best known for his participation in the Exorcism of Roland Doe.

== Life ==
Hughes participated in an exorcism in 1949 at the Georgetown University Hospital on an anonymous thirteen-year-old boy, where he was allegedly injured when the boy broke out of his restraints.

William Peter Blatty was inspired by a newspaper article about this case to write his novel The Exorcist.

In 1973, Father Hughes returned to St. James Church and later became pastor at St Matthias until his death of a heart attack on October 12, 1980.
