= Walter Halloran =

American priest (1921–2005)

Walter H. Halloran
- Born: September 21, 1921; Jackson, Minnesota
- Died: March 1, 2005 (aged 83)
- Occupation: Jesuit priest
- Known for: Assisting in exorcism of Roland Doe

Walter H. Halloran SJ (September 21, 1921 – March 1, 2005) was a Catholic priest of the Society of Jesus who, at the age of twenty-six, assisted in the exorcism of Roland Doe in Washington, D.C., and St. Louis, Missouri. The anonymous Doe, a thirteen-year-old Lutheran boy from Cottage City, Maryland, was allegedly possessed. The case inspired William Peter Blatty to write his novel The Exorcist.

== Life ==
Halloran was born in Jackson, Minnesota, in 1921. He was the oldest of nine children. He became a student at the Campion Jesuit High School in Prairie du Chien, Wisconsin, in 1934. He was a member of the school's football team. In 1941, he became a member of the Society of Jesus. Halloran attended St. Louis University and in 1954 was ordained a priest, and two years later began teaching theology and history at his old school the Campion Jesuit High boarding school in Prairie du Chien, while also coaching football. In 1963 he moved to Marquette University, where he taught history until 1966 when he volunteered for chaplain duty with the United States Army. He first served in Germany but in 1969, at the age of 48, he volunteered for paratrooper training and then for duty in Vietnam where he would say he saw more evil than in the boy's hospital bed back in 1949. According to his brother John Halloran, he really wanted to work with the men. Halloran would helicopter in to the fighting zones, sometimes staying for days on end ministering to the soldiers. By the end of his service as a paratrooper chaplain in 1971, he had earned two Bronze Stars. After his service was over, he went back to St. Louis in 1972 to teach at St. Louis University High and to serve as assistant director of campus ministry and then alumni director. Halloran would have a variety of assignments from then on, such as being an associate pastor in his hometown of Jackson, Minnesota, and running a parish ministry in San Diego, California. In 1988, Halloran was an assistant director of the alumni office at Creighton University in Omaha.

== Exorcism ==
According to author Thomas B. Allen, Halloran "expressed his skepticism about potential paranormal events before his death." When asked in an interview to make a statement on whether the boy had been possessed, Halloran responded saying "No, I can’t go on record, I never made an absolute statement about the things because I didn’t feel I was qualified."

== Death ==
In 2003, Halloran was diagnosed with cancer and retired to the St. Camillus Jesuit Community in Wauwatosa, Wisconsin, where he died on March 1, 2005. At the time of his death, he was the last surviving Jesuit who had assisted in the 1949 case.
