= William S. Bowdern =

American Catholic exorcist (1897–1983)

Rev. Fr. William Sporing Bowdern, S.J.
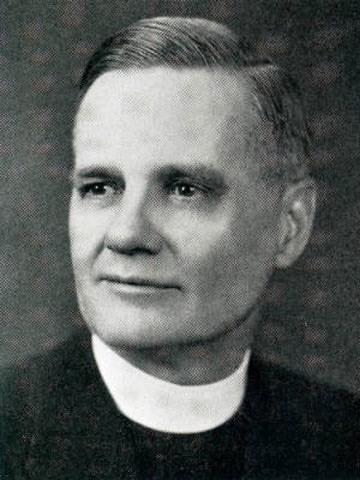
- Born: February 13, 1897; St. Louis, Missouri, US
- Died: April 25, 1983 (aged 86); St. Louis, Missouri, US
- Resting place: Calvary Cemetery (St. Louis)
- Education: St. Louis University High School
- Known for: The 1949 Exorcism of Roland Doe

William S. Bowdern (February 13, 1897 – April 25, 1983) was a Catholic priest of the Society of Jesus in St. Louis, Missouri. He was the author of The Problems of Courtship and Marriage printed by Our Sunday Visitor in 1939. He was a graduate of and taught at St. Louis University High School; he also taught at Saint Louis University.

Most notably, Bowdern was the lead exorcist in the exorcism of Roland Doe in 1949. The incident became the basis of William Peter Blatty's 1971 novel The Exorcist and the 1973 William Friedkin film The Exorcist.

== Exorcism ==
In 1949, Bowdern was assisted in the exorcism of an anonymously named boy by fellow Jesuit priest Walter Halloran. Author William Peter Blatty contacted Bowdern as part of his research for his novel The Exorcist. In a 2000 TV movie titled Possessed, Bowdern was played by Timothy Dalton.
