= The Exorcist (novel) =

1971 novel by William Peter Blatty

- First edition cover
- Author: William Peter Blatty
- Language: American English
- Genre: Horror
- Publisher: Harper & Row
- Publication date: May 5, 1971
- Publication place: United States
- Media type: Print (hardcover, paperback)
- Pages: 340 (first edition)
- ISBN: 978-0-06-010365-1
- OCLC: 29760583
- Followed by: The Ninth Configuration

The Exorcist is a 1971 horror novel by American author William Peter Blatty and published by Harper & Row. The book depicts a demonic possession of twelve-year-old Regan MacNeil, the daughter of a famous actress, and the two Roman Catholic priests who attempt to exorcise the demon. The novel was the basis of a highly successful 1973 film adaptation, whose screenplay was also written and produced by Blatty, for which he won the Academy Award for Best Adapted Screenplay and was nominated for Best Picture. More movies and books were eventually added to The Exorcist franchise.

The novel was inspired by a 1949 case of supposed demonic possession and exorcism that Blatty heard about while he was a student in the class of 1950 at Georgetown University. As a result, the novel takes place in Washington, D.C., near the campus of Georgetown University. In September 2011, the novel was reprinted by HarperCollins to celebrate its 40th anniversary, with slight revisions made by Blatty as well as interior title artwork by Jeremy Caniglia.

== Plot ==
An elderly Jesuit priest named Father Lankester Merrin is leading an archaeological dig in northern Iraq and is studying ancient relics. After discovering a small statue of the demon Pazuzu (an actual ancient Assyrian demon), a series of omens alerts him to a pending confrontation with a powerful evil, which, unknown to the reader at this point, he has battled before in an exorcism in Africa.

Meanwhile, in Georgetown, a young girl named Regan MacNeil is living with her famous mother, actress Chris MacNeil, who is in Georgetown filming a movie. Chris has rented a house for her and Regan to reside in during the filming. Regan finds a Ouija board in the basement of the home, which she uses to communicate with an entity who identifies itself as "Captain Howdy". As Chris finishes her work on the film, Regan begins to become inexplicably ill. After a gradual series of poltergeist-like disturbances in their rented house, for which Chris attempts to find rational explanations, Regan begins to rapidly undergo disturbing psychological and physical changes. She refuses to eat or sleep, becomes withdrawn, and increasingly aggressive and violent. Regan contorts her body to bow and bend in impossible directions, at one point following around her tutor Sharon, hissing at her. Chris initially mistakes Regan's behavior for the result of repressed anger over her parents' divorce and absent father.

Coupled with these events are disturbances at the local Holy Trinity Church, which has been desecrated on several recent occasions. Detective Kinderman begins investigating Father Karras, as they exchange disturbing stories of Black Masses, Catholic theology and 1960s film stars. At this point in the novel, Burke Dennings, Chris's movie director, has been killed, with his head turned completely around. "Could another human being have done it? Yes, but he'd have to be an exceptionally powerful man."

After several unsuccessful psychiatric and medical treatments (X-rays, medication, temporal lobe analysis), Regan's mother, an atheist, turns to a local Jesuit priest for help as Regan's personality becomes increasingly disturbed and the doctors still cannot find a source. Father Damien Karras, who is currently going through a crisis of faith coupled with the recent loss of his mother, agrees to see Regan as a psychiatrist, but initially resists the notion that it is an actual demonic possession, pointing to advances in science which can explain what was previously assumed to be possession. After a few meetings with the child, now completely inhabited by a diabolical personality claiming to be the devil, he turns to the local bishop for permission to perform an exorcism on the child.

The bishop with whom he consults does not believe Karras is qualified to perform the rites, and appoints the experienced Merrin—who has recently returned to the United States—to perform the exorcism, although he does allow the doubt-ridden Karras to assist him. The lengthy exorcism tests the priests both physically and spiritually. When Merrin, who had previously suffered cardiac arrhythmia, dies during the process, completion of the exorcism ultimately falls upon Father Karras. When he demands that the demonic spirit inhabit him instead of the innocent Regan, the demon seizes the opportunity to possess the priest. Karras heroically surrenders his own life in exchange for Regan's by jumping out of her bedroom window and dies, regaining his faith in God as his last rites are read.

== Writing ==
Blatty had considered writing a novel based on the Doe exorcism since he had written about it as a college student, even as he became successful as a comic novelist and screenwriter in the early 1960s, but his agent talked him out of doing so when he raised the subject. But after seeing the film version of Ira Levin's Rosemary's Baby in 1968, Blatty told his wife that he wanted to write a story like that. He liked the way director Roman Polanski had kept the audience unsure whether the title character's concerns for her unborn child were genuine or not, but felt the ending was "schlocky", reducing the Devil to a joke.

Blatty believed he could improve on the ending of Rosemary's Baby, making the spiritual struggle a more central theme of the story. After he pitched the story to an editor at Bantam Books at a cocktail party, he received a $25,000 advance ($231,000 in 2025) and began writing at his home in Encino, California, taking stimulants to write for 16 hours a day and finish the novel in the expected 10 months. As he wrote, the story, which Blatty originally envisioned taking place largely in a courtroom, instead moved to the locations of the events recounted and became darker, with the possessed Regan masturbating with a crucifix and screaming obscene words at the priests trying to cast the demon out, all to make the evil more uniformly repulsive to readers.

== Inspirations ==
Aspects of the Father Merrin character were based on the British archaeologist Gerald Lankester Harding, who had excavated the caves where the Dead Sea Scrolls had been found and whom Blatty had met in Beirut. Blatty has stated that Harding "was the physical model in my mind when I created the character [of Merrin], whose first name, please note, is Lankester". Another inspiration was the Jesuit theologian Pierre Teilhard de Chardin, a trained archeologist who worked on several notable digs.

Aspects of the novel were inspired by an exorcism performed by the Jesuit priest, Fr. William S. Bowdern, who formerly taught at both St. Louis University and St. Louis University High School. Recent investigative research by freelance journalist Mark Opsasnick indicates that this was the real 1949 exorcism of a young boy from Cottage City, Maryland, whom Opsasnick refers to using the pseudonyms Robbie Mannheim and Roland Doe. The boy was sent to his relative's home on Roanoke Drive in St. Louis where most of the exorcism took place. However, according to the journalist: "There is simply too much evidence that indicates that as a boy he [Roland Doe] had serious emotional problems stemming from his home life. There is not one shred of hard evidence to support the notion of demonic possession".

Blatty refers to the Loudun possessions and the Louviers possessions throughout the story, mostly when Fr. Karras is researching possession and exorcism to present the case to his superiors. He also has one of his characters tell a brief story about an unnamed fraudulent medium who had studied to be a Jesuit priest. This story can be found in Proceedings of the Society for Psychical Research, Vol. 114. 1930, in an article about fraudulent practices by Daniel Dunglas Home.

It has been speculated that Shirley MacLaine, a former neighbor of the Blattys in California, may have been the basis for the Chris MacNeil character. The last name is similar; "MacNeil" is an anagram of "McLaine." Another correspondence between life and art: at the time Blatty knew MacLaine, she, like Chris MacNeil, had a married European couple as household staff. In addition, Blatty incorporated quotes from McLaine into the novel's dialogue.

== Achievements ==
According to research from the Spanish Book Institute, the Spanish-translated version was the eighth-most popular book sold in Spain in 1975.

== Editions ==
Cemetery Dance published a special omnibus edition of The Exorcist and its sequel Legion in October 2010, signed by Blatty (ISBN 978-1587672118). A limited edition of 750 copies (with an additional 52 leatherbound copies), it is now out of print. In September 2011, The Exorcist was re-released as a 40th Anniversary Edition in paperback, hardcover and audiobook editions with differing cover artwork. This new, updated edition featured and revised material, as Blatty writes: "The 40th Anniversary Edition of The Exorcist will have a touch of new material in it as part of an all-around polish of the dialogue and prose. It also features all new cover artwork and interiors by the artist Jeremy Caniglia. First time around I never had the time (meaning the funds) to do a second draft, and this, finally, is it. With forty years to think about it, a few little changes were inevitable — plus one new character in a totally new, very spooky scene. This is the version I would like to be remembered for".

=== Translations ===
The novel was translated into many languages including Spanish and Bengali. The Bengali translation was done by the late popular Bangladeshi novelist and screenwriter Humayun Ahmed.

== Adaptations ==
=== Feature film ===
In 1973, the novel was adapted by Blatty for the film of the same name and directed by William Friedkin with Ellen Burstyn, Max von Sydow, Lee J. Cobb, Jack MacGowran, Jason Miller and Linda Blair. The screenplay for the film won Blatty an Academy Award for Best Adapted Screenplay. In 1974 famed Japanese horror author Kazuo Umezu also created a short comic adaptation of this film.

=== Radio ===
In February 2014, BBC Radio 4 broadcast a two-part adaptation of the novel by Robert Forrest produced and directed by Gaynor MacFarlane and starring Robert Glenister as Father Karras, Lydia Wilson as Regan, Teresa Gallagher as Chris MacNeil, Karl Johnson as Detective Kinderman, Bryan Dick as Father Dyer, Alexandra Mathie as The Demon and Ian McDiarmid as Father Merrin.

=== Theatre ===
A stage adaptation of the novel was written by John Pielmeier and premiered at Geffen Playhouse in Los Angeles in July 2012. It was directed by John Doyle and starred Brooke Shields, David Wilson Barnes, Richard Chamberlain, Emily Yetter, Harry Groener, Roslyn Ruff, Manoel Felciano, Tom Nelis, and Stephen Bogardus. The play made its UK premiere at the Birmingham Repertory Theatre in October 2016, co-produced by Bill Kenwright. The new production was directed by Sean Mathias, designed by Anna Fleischle and starred Jenny Seagrove as Chris, Peter Bowles as Merrin and Adam Garcia as Damien.

== See also ==
- Edward Hughes
- Robbie Mannheim
- Walter Halloran (Fr. Walter Halloran)
- William S. Bowdern (Fr. William Bowdern)
