= The Exorcist =

1973 film by William Friedkin

- Theatrical release poster by Bill Gold
- Directed by: William Friedkin
- Screenplay by: William Peter Blatty
- Based on: The Exorcist by William Peter Blatty
- Produced by: William Peter Blatty
- Starring: Ellen Burstyn; Max von Sydow; Lee J. Cobb; Kitty Winn; Jack MacGowran; Jason Miller; Linda Blair
- Cinematography: Owen Roizman
- Edited by: Evan A. Lottman; Norman Gay; Bud S. Smith; Jordan Leondopoulos (sup.)
- Music by: Jack Nitzsche
- Production company: Hoya Productions
- Distributed by: Warner Bros.
- Release date: December 26, 1973
- Running time: 122 minutes
- Country: United States
- Language: English
- Budget: $12 million
- Box office: $441.3 million

The Exorcist is a 1973 American supernatural horror film directed by William Friedkin and produced by William Peter Blatty, who adapted his own 1971 novel. The film stars Ellen Burstyn, Max von Sydow, Jason Miller, and Linda Blair, and follows the demonic possession of a young girl and the attempt to rescue her through an exorcism by two Catholic priests.

Blatty and Friedkin had difficulty casting the film. Their choice of relative unknowns Burstyn, Blair, and Miller, instead of major stars, drew opposition from executives at Warner Bros. Principal photography was also difficult. Many cast and crew were injured, some died, and unusual accidents delayed shooting. Production took twice as long as scheduled and cost almost three times the initial budget; the many mishaps have led to a belief that the film was cursed.

The Exorcist was theatrically released in the United States on December 26, 1973, by Warner Bros. Reviews were mixed, but audiences waited in long lines during cold weather; the sold-out shows were even more profitable for Warner Bros., who had booked it into those theaters under four-wall distribution rental agreements, a first for any major studio. Some viewers suffered adverse physical reactions, fainting or vomiting to shocking scenes such as a realistic cerebral angiography. Many children were allowed to see the film, leading to charges that the Motion Picture Association of America (MPAA, now the MPA) had accommodated the studio by giving the film an R rating instead of an X rating to ensure the troubled production its commercial success. Several cities attempted to ban it outright or prevent children from attending. At the end of its original theatrical run, the film grossed $193 million, and has a lifetime gross of $441 million with subsequent re-releases.

The cultural conversation around the film helped it become the first horror film to be nominated for the Academy Award for Best Picture, as well as nine others. Blatty won Best Adapted Screenplay, while the sound engineers took Best Sound. It has had several sequels and was the highest-grossing R-rated horror film (unadjusted for inflation) until 2017's It. The Exorcist significantly influenced pop culture, and it has been included on lists of the greatest films ever made. In 2010, the Library of Congress selected the film for preservation in the United States National Film Registry as being "culturally, historically, or aesthetically significant".

== Plot ==
In northern Iraq, priest Lankester Merrin takes part in an archaeological dig in the ancient ruins of Hatra. During the dig, he finds a stone talisman of a winged being that evokes a concerned look on his face. He then visits an ancient statue of the same being, silently confronting it.

In Georgetown, Washington, D.C., actress Chris MacNeil is starring in a film directed by her friend Burke Dennings. Chris, along with her 12-year-old daughter Regan MacNeil, rents a large house with hired help. While spending time in the house, Regan discovers a spirit board. Unaware of traditional superstitions regarding the board, she plays with it alone. She tells her mother she has made repeated contact with an entity she calls "Captain Howdy." Meanwhile, Father Damien Karras, a psychiatrist who counsels Georgetown University priests, visits his ailing mother in New York City. He later confides to a colleague that he is having a crisis of faith.

Chris hosts a party with Karras's friend, Father Joseph Dyer, who explains Karras's role as counselor and notes his mother's recent death. Regan, seemingly unwell, appears and urinates before Chris comforts her. Regan's bed shakes violently after Chris returns her to it. Later, Dyer consoles Karras, guilty at not having been with his mother when she died.

Regan's personality becomes violent, and medical tests find no physical cause. During a house call, Regan exhibits abnormal strength and adult behavior, and speaks in an otherworldly voice. One night, Chris finds the house empty except for a sleeping Regan; Dennings had been left with her but is found dead at the bottom of a set of public stairs that begin beneath Regan's window. Detective William Kinderman questions Karras, confiding that Dennings's head was turned backward. Kinderman tells Chris that the only plausible explanation for Dennings's death is that he was pushed from Regan's window. As Kinderman leaves, a scarred and bloody Regan has another violent fit, furiously masturbating with a crucifix, turning her head backward and speaking in the voice of Dennings. She is confined to her bedroom and strapped to the bed.

Now convinced that her daughter is possessed, Chris seeks out Karras, who visits Regan. The possessed Regan claims to be the Devil, and vomits into Karras's face while speaking in tongues. The demon says it will remain in Regan until she is dead. Karras throws holy water onto Regan, causing her to react violently and speak in a bizarre language which he records. He later admits to Chris that it was tap water, causing him to doubt she is possessed. He has a linguist analyze the language on the tape, who concludes that it is perfect English being spoken backward. At night, Chris's assistant Sharon Spencer calls Karras to the house, where the words 'help me' appear carved in Regan's stomach from the inside; he concludes that an exorcism is warranted. His superior grants permission on the condition that an experienced priest lead the ritual. Merrin, having performed an exorcism before, is summoned.

Merrin arrives at the house. As the two priests read from the Roman Ritual, the demon curses them. The priests rest and Merrin, shaking, takes nitroglycerin. Karras enters the bedroom where the demon appears as his mother, perturbing Karras despite his denials. Merrin excuses Karras and continues the exorcism by himself. Chris approaches Karras and asks if Regan will die. He assures her that she will not and re-enters the room, finding Merrin dead from a heart attack while Regan watches and laughs. Enraged, Karras beats the possessed Regan and demands that the demon take him instead. The demon rips the medallion of Saint Joseph from Karras's neck and does so, freeing Regan in the process. Unwilling to let the demon harm Regan, Karras sacrifices himself by jumping out the window, tumbling down the stone stairs outside to his death. Chris and Kinderman enter the room. Chris embraces the freed Regan, and Kinderman surveys the scene. Outside, Dyer administers the dying Karras his last rites.

The MacNeils prepare to leave, and Father Dyer says goodbye. Despite having no memory of her ordeal, Regan, moved by the sight of Dyer's clerical collar, kisses him on the cheek. As the MacNeils leave, Chris gives Dyer the medallion found in Regan's room. Dyer briefly examines the steps where Karras died before walking away.

== Cast ==
- Ellen Burstyn as Chris MacNeil
- Max von Sydow as Father Lankester Merrin
- Jason Miller as Father / Dr. Damien Karras, SJ
- Lee J. Cobb as Lieutenant William F. Kinderman
- Kitty Winn as Sharon Spencer
- Jack MacGowran as Burke Dennings
- Linda Blair as Regan MacNeil
- Father William O'Malley as Father Joseph Dyer
- Barton Heyman as Dr. Samuel Klein
- Peter Masterson as Dr. Barringer
- Rudolf Schündler as Karl
- Gina Petrushka as Willi Engstrom
- Robert Symonds as Dr. Taney
- Arthur Storch as the Psychiatrist
- Father Thomas Bermingham as Father Tom Kanavan, President of Georgetown University
- Vasiliki Maliaros as Mrs. Karras, Damien's mother
- Titos Vandis as John, Damien's uncle
- John Mahon as Language Lab Director
- Wallace Rooney as Bishop Michael
- Ron Faber as Chuck
- Donna Mitchell as Mary Jo Perrin
- Roy Cooper as Jesuit Dean
- Robert Gerringer as Senator at Party

The demon Pazuzu is portrayed by Mercedes McCambridge (voice), Ron Faber (vocal effects), and Eileen Dietz (face). The demonic "spider walk" was performed by stunt double Ann Miles.

Uncredited members of the cast include writer-producer William Peter Blatty as Fromme, Paul Bateson as a Radiologist's assistant, Elinore Blair (Linda Blair's mother) as a nurse, Dick Callinan as Captain Billy Cutshaw, Barton Lane as an angiographer, and Vincent Russell as the subway vagrant.

== Production ==
=== Development ===
Aspects of Blatty's novel were inspired by the 1949 exorcism performed by Jesuit priest William S. Bowdern. It sold poorly until Blatty captivated The Dick Cavett Show's audience with a discussion of whether the devil existed. Soon afterwards the novel topped the New York Times best seller list.

Despite Blatty's previous screenwriting experience on Blake Edwards' films, studios had been uninterested in adapting The Exorcist before publication. Lew Grade made a modest offer for the rights that Blatty said later he would have accepted due to his difficult financial circumstances, but for his requirement that he produce. Shirley MacLaine, a friend of Blatty's, (Note: He may have based the Chris MacNeil character on her.) had been interested, but wanted someone other than Blatty to produce. A later agreement to co-produce with Paul Monash, producer of Butch Cassidy and the Sundance Kid, collapsed over script differences and Blatty's discovery that Monash was trying to wrest control of the film.

=== Writing ===
Blatty's screenplay follows the plot of his novel closely, but narrows the story's focus. Subplots like the desecration of the churches and the subsequent relationship that develops between Karras and Kinderman, Karras's efforts to convince the Church bureaucracy to approve the exorcism, and the ongoing medical investigations of Regan's condition are less prominent in the film, as are supporting characters including Chris's household staff, Dennings, and Regan's father. The overall time frame is condensed.

Some scenes, particularly those with sexual content, were toned down for the film adaptation since an actress of approximately Regan's age was expected to be cast. The scene where Regan masturbates with a crucifix was, in the book, more prolonged and explicit, with Regan seriously injuring herself yet attaining orgasm. The film also excludes the possessed Regan's constant diarrhea, giving her room a strong, foul odor.

Blatty also made the screenplay unambiguous about Regan's condition. In his novel, every symptom and behavior she exhibits that might indicate possession is counterbalanced with a reference to an actual case where the same phenomena were found to have natural, scientific causes. Aside from Karras' initial professional skepticism, that perspective is absent from the film.

=== Casting ===
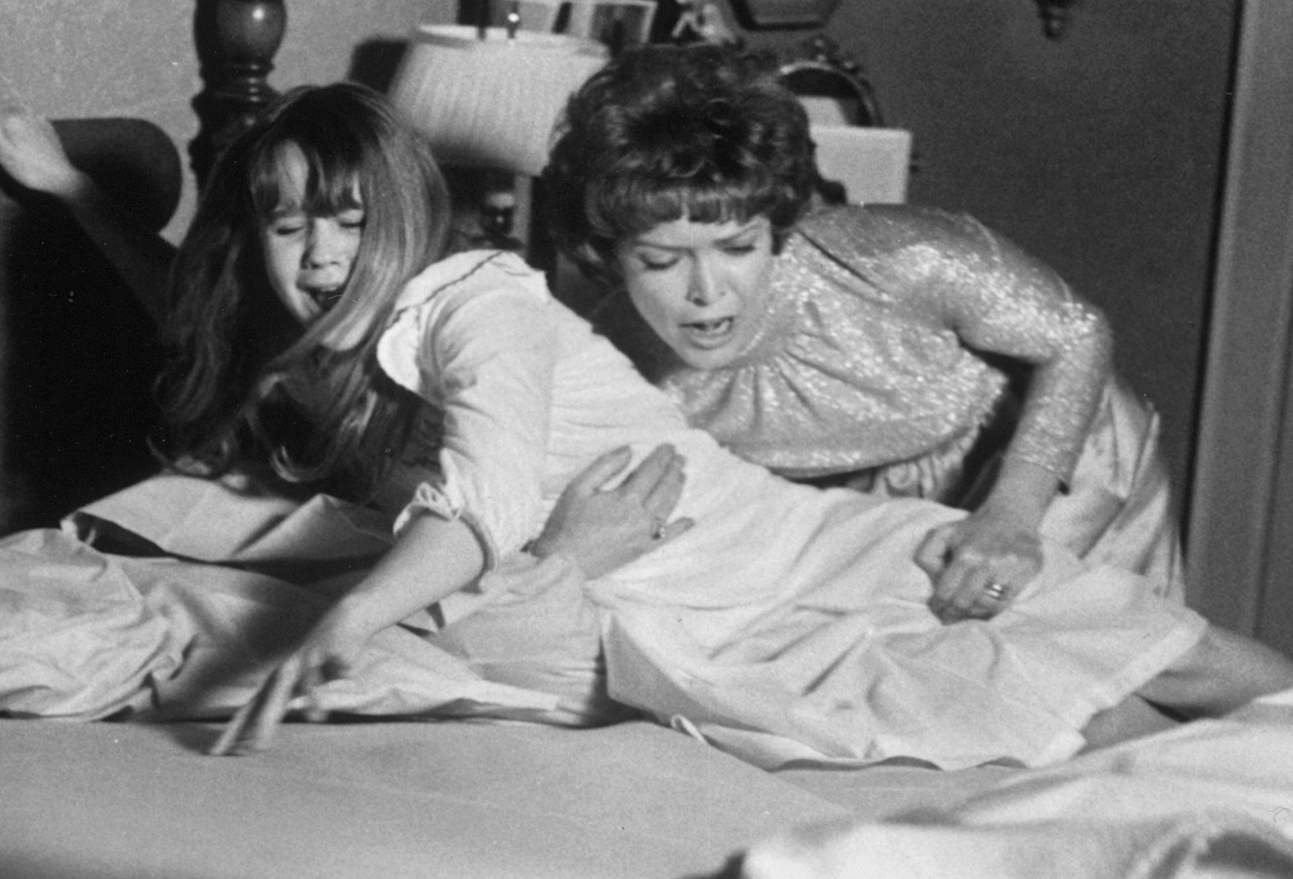
(L-R) Blair and Burstyn as Regan and Chris MacNeil

The lead roles, particularly Regan, were not easily cast. Although many major stars of the era were considered for them, Blatty and Friedkin ultimately went with lesser-known actors, to the studio's consternation.

==== Chris and Father Karras ====
Jack Nicholson was considered for Karras, and Paul Newman was interested, before Blatty hired Stacy Keach. Three A-list actresses of the time—Audrey Hepburn, Anne Bancroft and Jane Fonda—were considered for Chris, but rejected the part. Friedkin also rejected Blatty's friend Shirley MacLaine since she had starred in The Possession of Joel Delaney, a similar film. After meeting Carol Burnett, Friedkin believed she had the range beyond her comic television persona. Blatty agreed, but the studio turned her down. Ellen Burstyn received the part after she told Friedkin she was "destined" to play Chris, discussing the Catholic upbringing she had later rejected. Studio head Ted Ashley vigorously opposed casting her, but relented after no other alternatives emerged.

Friedkin had first spoken to stage actor and playwright Jason Miller after a performance of his play That Championship Season, and given him a copy of the novel. Miller had received a Catholic education and studied to be a Jesuit priest for three years at Catholic University of America until experiencing a spiritual crisis similar to Karras's. Upon reading the novel, he told Friedkin "[Karras] is me". Friedkin responded that Keach had already been signed, but granted his request for a screen test. During the test, Miller and Burstyn performed the scene where Chris informs Karras that she suspects Regan might be possessed. He then filmed Burstyn interviewing Miller about his life and asked him to recite Mass as if for the first time. After viewing the footage the next morning, Friedkin realized that Miller's "dark good looks, haunted eyes, quiet intensity, and low, compassionate voice" were exactly what the part needed. The studio then bought out Keach's contract.

==== Regan ====
Directors considered for The Exorcist doubted a young actress could carry the film; Mike Nichols had turned it down for that reason, but would later regret it. The first actresses considered had been in other successful films and television series. Pamelyn Ferdin was turned down as too familiar. Denise Nickerson, who had played Violet Beauregarde in Willy Wonka & the Chocolate Factory, said in later interviews her family found the script too dark. Janet Leigh would not let her daughter, Jamie Lee Curtis, audition. Eve Plumb auditioned for the role. Friedkin was considering older actresses until Elinore Blair (Note: Eventually cast herself as a nurse.) came in unannounced with her daughter Linda, whose credits were primarily in modeling and a single soap opera role. Friedkin later recalled her as "[S]mart but not precocious ... cute but not beautiful. A normal, happy 12-year-old girl". He asked if she knew what The Exorcist was about; she told him she had read the book. (Note: Blair confirmed this but said in 2021 she had not fully understood it. While she found it "odd" that she was doing the things she was doing with a crucifix and saying the lines later dubbed over by Mercedes McCambridge, she did not appreciate the significance of what she was doing or why as she had been raised a Congregationalist.) "[I]t's about a little girl who gets possessed by the devil and does a whole bunch of bad things." Friedkin then asked her what she meant. "[S]he pushes a man out of her bedroom window and she hits her mother across the face and she masturbates with a crucifix." Friedkin then asked Linda if she knew what masturbation meant. "It's like jerking off, isn't it?", and she giggled a little bit. "Have you ever done that?" he asked. "Sure; haven't you?" she responded.

Blair was cast after tests with Burstyn. "After all these difficult scenes she'd tiptoe around and giggle, after every bit", Blatty recalled. Friedkin said "there wasn't one other [actress] I would have considered". He had planned to use Blair's electronically treated voice for Pazuzu's dialogue, but decided that a more androgynous voice was better, and cast experienced voice actress Mercedes McCambridge. McCambridge ate raw eggs, drank whiskey and chainsmoked cigarettes to make Pazuzu's voice sound as intimidating as possible. After filming, the studio did not credit her, until Screen Actors Guild arbitration. McCambridge's name was included in the credits on all but the first 30 prints, but the dispute prevented the release of a soundtrack album with excerpts of dialogue. Warner Bros. reportedly forced Friedkin to use Eileen Dietz, then Blair's senior of 15 years, as Blair's stunt double. She stood in for Blair in the crucifix scene, the fistfight with Father Karras, and others too violent or disturbing for Blair to perform. She recalled that Friedkin gave her no notes and said, "I wasn't playing a little girl, I was playing the demon that possessed a little girl." Dietz appears on camera as the face of Pazuzu. Blair, who recalls Friedkin telling her the film would not succeed if she was not in as many shots as possible, estimates that Dietz is in 17 seconds of the film. Dietz, angry that her contribution to the film had been minimized, claimed in the media to have performed all the possession scenes. The studio ultimately measured her screen presence at 28.25 seconds, but denied that her contribution was dramatically significant.

==== Supporting roles ====
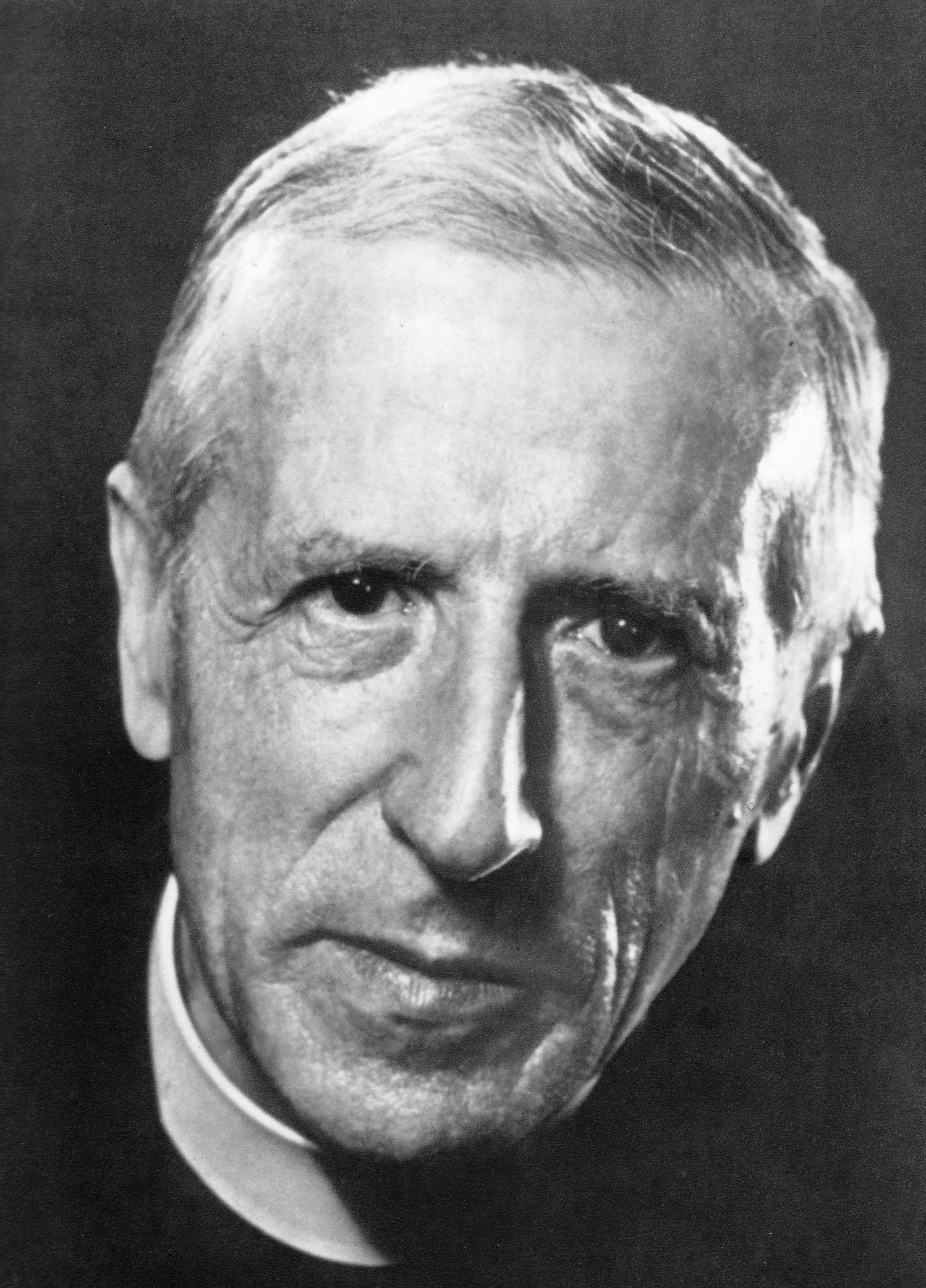
The image of Pierre Teilhard de Chardin that inspired Friedkin to cast von Sydow

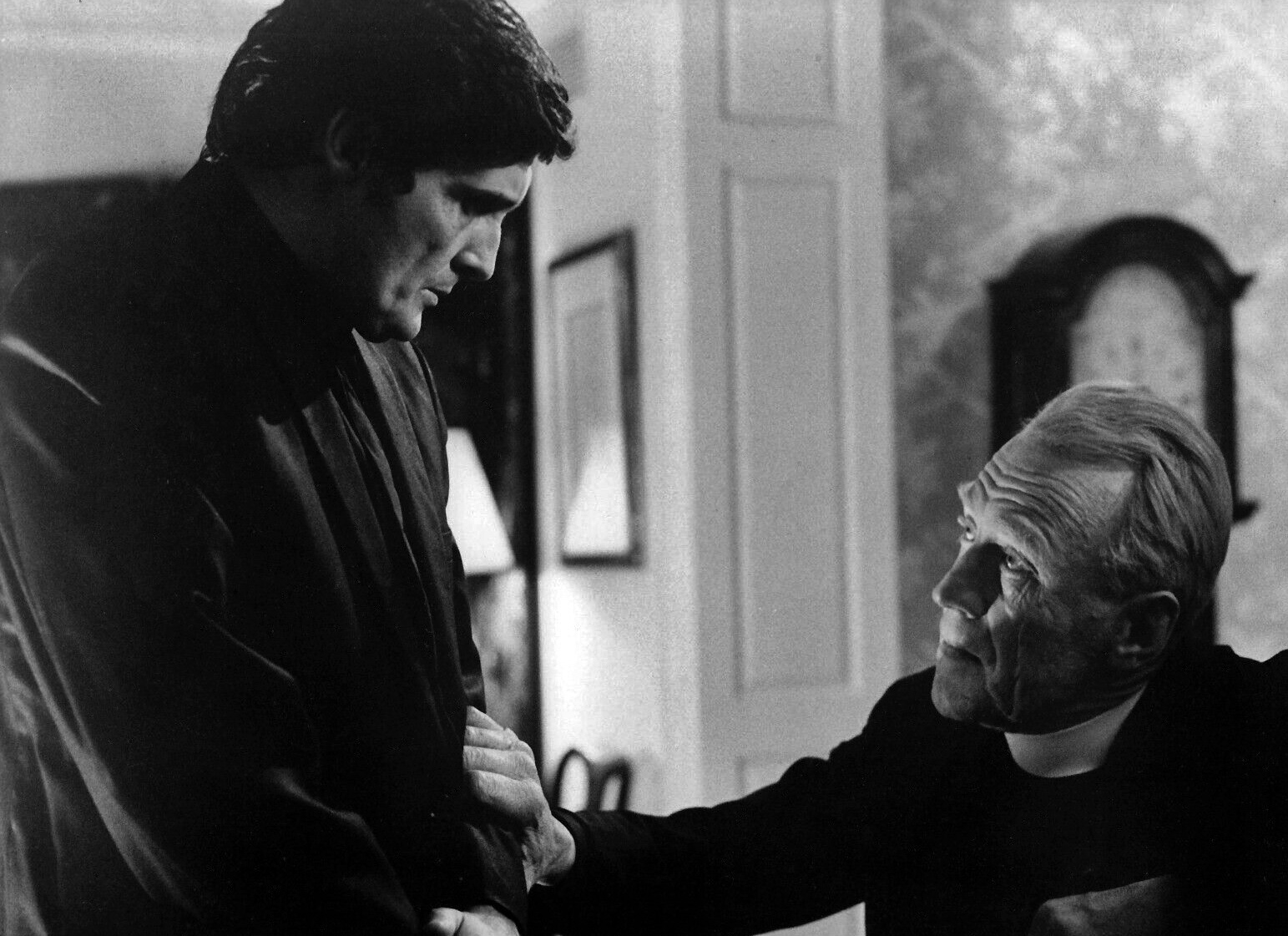
Miller and von Sydow as Karras and Merrin

Warner Bros. wanted Marlon Brando for the role of Lankester Merrin, but Friedkin refused. A Philippe Halsman photograph of Pierre Teilhard de Chardin, one of Blatty's inspirations for Father Merrin, inspired Friedkin to cast Max von Sydow instead of Paul Scofield, whom Blatty had wanted.

The film's supporting roles were cast more quickly. At a play, Blatty and Friedkin ran into Lee J. Cobb, who was cast as Lt. Kinderman. Two priests were cast. Father William O'Malley, who had become acquainted with Blatty through his criticism of the novel, was cast as Father Dyer, whom he had considered clichéd in the novel. The Rev. Thomas Bermingham, a Georgetown professor who had assigned Blatty research on demonic possession as a student, took the role of the university president.

Jack MacGowran got the role of Dennings, which, earlier in the production, seemed to be going to J. Lee Thompson. A later cast listing adds Mary Boylan and The Rev. John Nicola, one of the film's technical advisors, in small roles. Greek actor Titos Vandis, cast as Karras's uncle, covered his face with a hat to avoid associations with his role in the recent Woody Allen film Everything You Always Wanted to Know About Sex* (*But Were Afraid to Ask). Friedkin cast Vasiliki Maliaros as Karras's mother after reportedly encountering her in a Greek restaurant.

=== Direction ===
In addition to Nichols, many directors were considered, including Arthur Penn, Stanley Kubrick, John Boorman (Note: He later directed the sequel, Exorcist II: The Heretic, after not only turning the original down but advised the studio against making it, calling it "negative and destructive".) and Peter Bogdanovich. The studio finally hired Mark Rydell, (Note: In 1991 Rydell said "that was never going to happen.") but Blatty insisted on Friedkin, with whom he was acquainted, as he had been impressed by his film The French Connection. Blatty saw Friedkin as "a director who can bring the look of documentary realism to this incredible story, and ... is never going to lie to me." The studio demurred, until Connection was released to commercial success and a Best Picture Academy Award.

During his press tour for Connection, Friedkin began reading a copy of the novel Blatty sent him. After the first 20 pages he canceled his dinner plans and finished the book, finding the story so gripping that he did not consider any problems adapting it to film. Friedkin felt that the film should unfold slowly, with audiences seeing everything that happened to Regan and the unsuccessful attempts at treating her condition. An early clash during production led to Warner Bros. telling Blatty he could not take any action against Friedkin. Afterwards, Blatty informed the studio he could no longer have any responsibility for controlling the budget; while he and Friedkin reconciled, production costs soon exceeded the initial $4.2 million ($24.5 million in 2025) budget.

Friedkin manipulated the actors to get genuine reactions. Unsatisfied with O'Malley's performance as Dyer ministers to the dying Karras at the end of the film, he slapped him hard across the face to generate a deeply solemn yet literally shaken reaction for the scene, offending many Catholic crew members. He also fired blanks without warning to elicit shock from Miller for a take; Dietz recalls him also doing this during the scene where Regan assaults the doctors at the house. Friedkin also told Miller that the vomit, porridge colored to resemble pea soup and pumped through a hidden tube, would hit him in the chest during the projectile vomiting scene, and rehearsed it that way. But when filmed, the soup hit his face, resulting in his disgusted reaction.

Crewmembers found Friedkin difficult to work with. On the first day of shooting, he had a wall removed to create space for the dolly to back up from a shot of bacon frying, then sent the prop master to look for preservative-free bacon, difficult to find at the time, since he did not like the way it curled. Another crewmember recalled returning after three days of sick leave to find Friedkin still shooting the same scene. Dietz recalls the main delay being reshoots, even of scenes that had been difficult to stage and film the first time, such as Regan's bed shaking. "People were literally placing bets on what he would reshoot next." He also fired and rehired crew regularly. One crewmember recalls seeing Friedkin shake hands warmly with someone, and then seconds later tell a second person to "get this guy outta here", earning him the nickname "Wacky Willy".

=== Cinematography ===
Owen Roizman, director of photography on The French Connection, worked in this position again on The Exorcist. He was in charge of filming every scene except for the Iraqi prologue, shot by Billy Williams. Roizman and Friedkin wanted The Exorcist, like their previous film, to appear to have been shot in available light. The MacNeil house was, unlike house interiors in horror films such as Psycho, designed to look normal and inviting, but lit to suggest an ominous presence. Otherwise, Roizman said, Friedkin "demanded complete realism" and "wanted to see pictures with glass in them, mirrors on the walls and all of the other highly reflective surfaces you would naturally find in a house[;] we never tried to cover anything up, as we would normally do for expedience in shooting." This meant that the kitchen set, with much stainless steel and glass, was "virtually impossible" to light beyond the practical ceiling fixtures and whatever other lights they could manage to sneak in and hide. "[W]e'd walk in, hit the switch and shoot—through not much choice."

=== Filming and locations ===
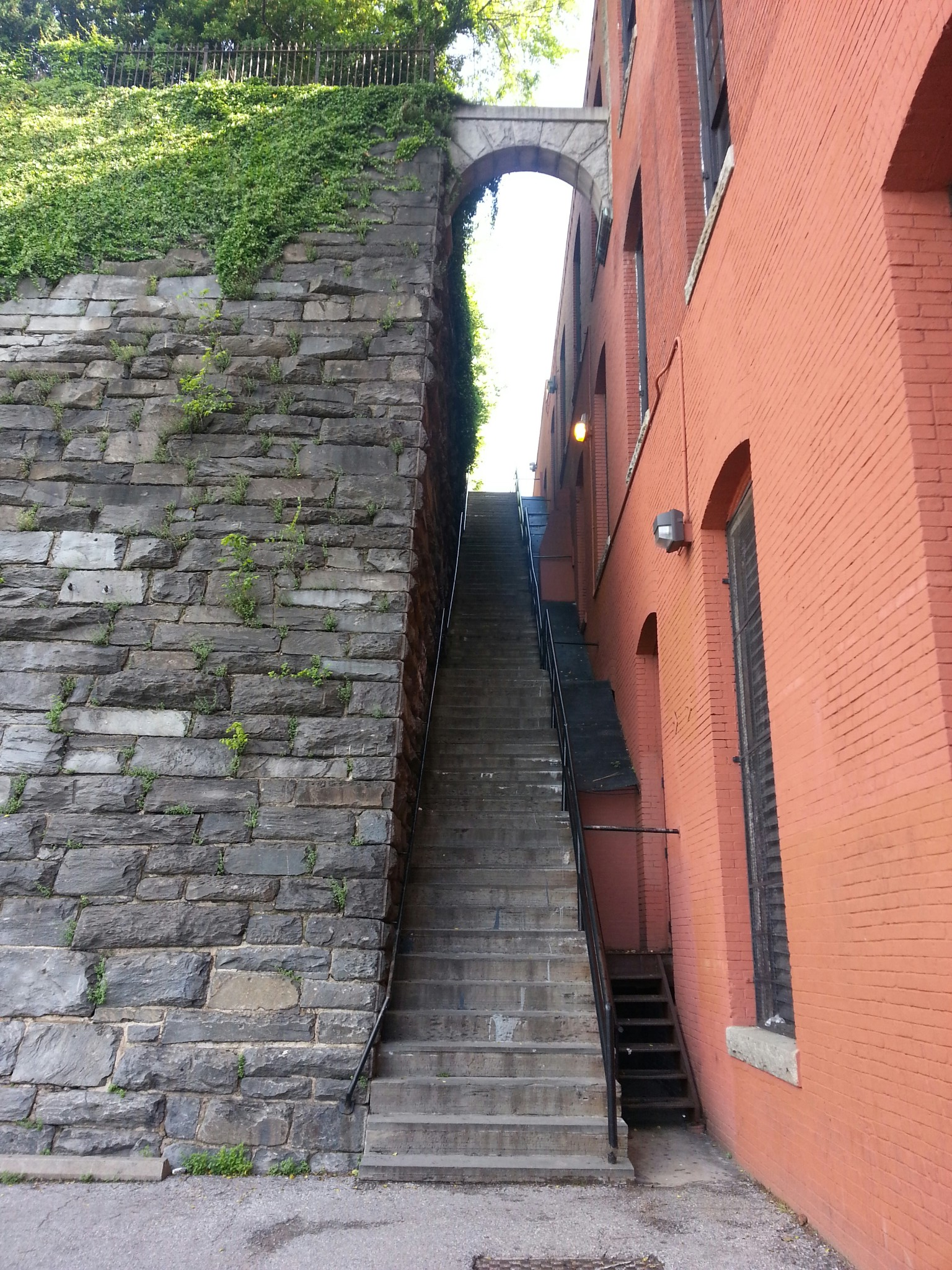
The "Exorcist steps", looking north, Georgetown, Washington, D.C.

Principal photography began August 14, 1972. Although the film is set in Washington, D.C., many interior scenes were shot in New York City. The MacNeil residence interiors were filmed at CECO Studios in Manhattan, with Karras's confrontation with his uncle, shot at Goldwater Memorial Hospital, now the site of Cornell Tech, on Roosevelt Island in the East River between Manhattan and Queens; the scenes with Karras's mother in the hospital were filmed at Bellevue. The scene where Father Karras listens to the tapes of Regan was filmed in the basement of Fordham University's Keating Hall, where O'Malley was an assistant professor of theology.

The film's opening sequences were filmed in and near Mosul, Iraq, at a time when the US and Iraq did not have diplomatic relations; Warner Bros. feared that Friedkin and his crew might not be able to return. He negotiated filming arrangements directly with local officials of the ruling Ba'ath Party, who required that he hire local workers as crew and teach filmmaking to interested residents. The archaeological dig site shown is Hatra, south-west of Mosul. Temperatures during the days reached 130 °F (54 °C), limiting shooting to dawn and dusk.

The exterior of the MacNeil house was a family home on 36th and Prospect streets in Washington. A mansard roof was added to account for the attic scene. The neighboring stairs were padded with a half-inch (13 mm) of rubber for Karras's death. The house was set back slightly from the steps, so the crew built an eastward extension with a false front to allow the stunt double playing Karras to fall directly down.

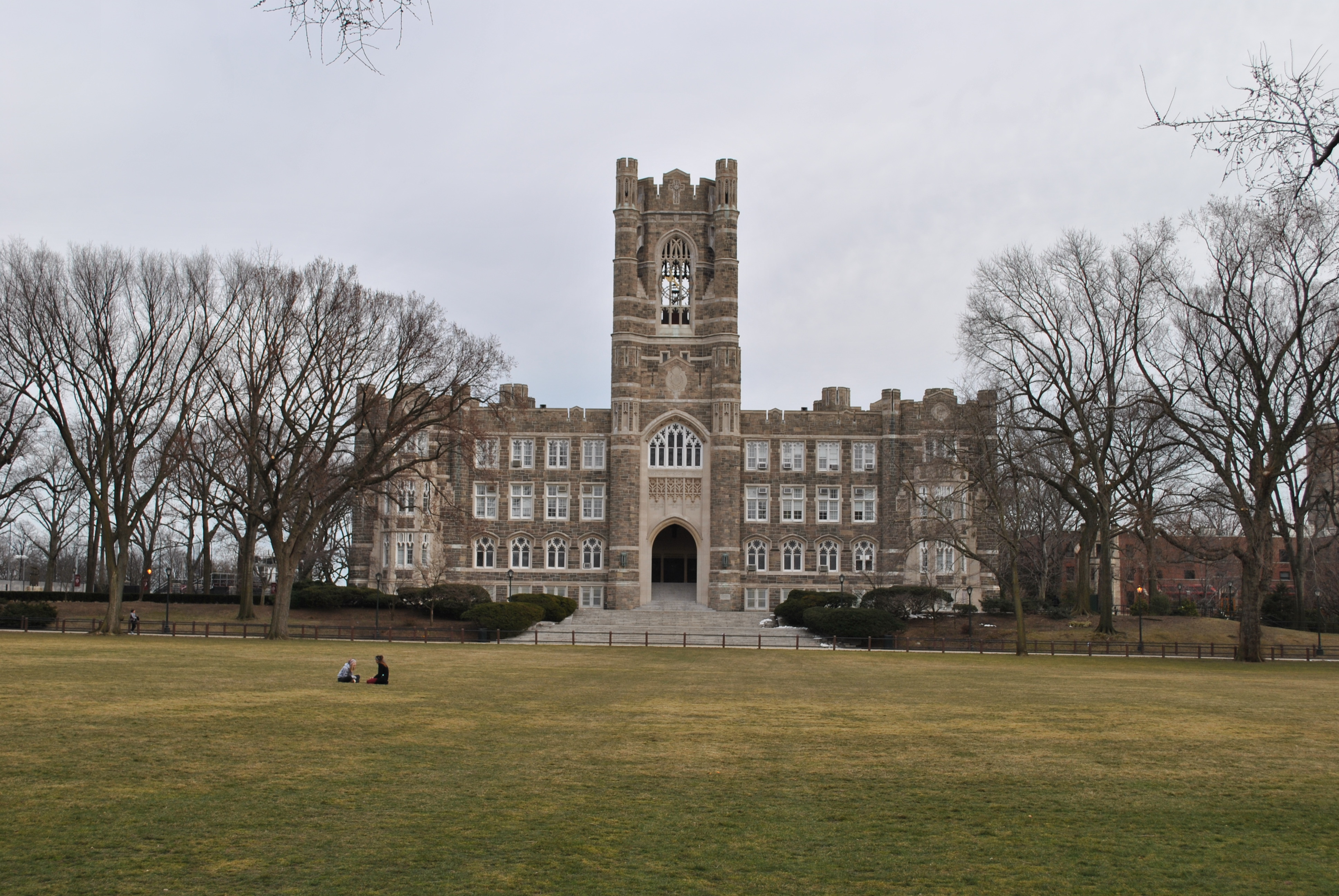
Several scenes were shot in the basement of Fordham University's Keating Hall.

Many Georgetown locations, on and off-campus, were used. Burstyn's first scene, where she lectures the protesters, was shot on the steps of Healy Hall; she is also seen walking down the steps of Lauinger Library. Other scenes used the interiors of Dahlgren Chapel and the university president's office, used as the archbishop's office. One scene was filmed in The Tombs, a popular local pub.

==== Exorcism scenes ====
The exorcism scenes were challenging to film. Friedkin wanted the bedroom set to be cold enough to see the actors' breath, as described in the novel. A $50,000 ($291,000 in 2025) refrigeration system was installed to cool the set to −20 °F (−29 °C). Since the set lighting warmed the air, it remained cold enough to film for only three minutes at a time. Due to frequent breakdowns, only five shots could be finished each day; the complete scene, filmed in script order, took a month to complete.

The scene where Regan levitates, with the actors' breath visible in the chilled air as the priests chant "The power of Christ compels you!"

It was easier to film some of the other supernatural manifestations, such as the bed rocking and the curtains blowing since the walls and ceiling of the set were capable of being moved to accommodate a camera. After the scene where the ceiling cracks it was replaced with one attached to the walls, requiring a hole be cut in it for the rig to go through when Regan levitates, the most challenging shot in the sequence. The 80-pound (36 kg) Blair wore a bodysuit under her nightgown with attached hooks for monofilament wires.

Roizman had filmed similar scenes before, painting the wires to match the background so they would not show. This was difficult on The Exorcist because of the changes in background. "We had to practically paint them frame by frame", he said. While most directors would have been satisfied to smooth out the scene in post-production, Friedkin wanted it done in longer takes.

Friedkin did not want any scenes in the movie to have "any kind of spooky lights that you typically saw in horror films", so all the light in the bedroom comes from a visible source. The room's color scheme also suggested black and white film, with gray taupe walls, Regan's bedding a neutral beige, and the priests in black. According to Roizman, white would have been too dominant. "In toning everything down like this, the only real color in the room became the skin tones", he said.

==== Father Merrin's arrival scene ====
Magritte painting (top, heavily cropped) and a still from the arrival scene inspired by the painting. Both depict a nighttime scene where two rectangular lighted second-story windows shine out onto a street below where an ornate streetlight stands.

Father Merrin's arrival scene was filmed on Max von Sydow's first day on set. The scene where he steps out of a cab and stands in front of the MacNeil residence, silhouetted in a misty streetlamp's glow and staring up at a beam of light from a bedroom window, is one of the most famous scenes in the movie, used for film posters and home media release covers. It was inspired by René Magritte's 1954 painting Empire of Light. Friedkin wanted to evoke visually the language Blatty used in the novel for this scene, likening Merrin to "a melancholy traveler frozen in time", standing next to a streetlight in the fog when he gets out of the cab.

He gave the crew a full day to light the scene, using mainly arc lights and tripod-mounted Troupers, and boosting the brightness of the existing streetlamps. Roizman said this was the most difficult of all the film's nighttime exterior shots. To get the beam of light the way Friedkin wanted it, the crew had to take the window frame out of the facade they had attached to the house for filming, put it behind the window and then put the spotlight in between the window and frame. As they were shooting, Roizman said, the wind picked up, making it hard to hold the fog effect. By working quickly, he and the camera crew were able to get the shot, with Friedkin finding the first take satisfactory.

==== Head spinning ====
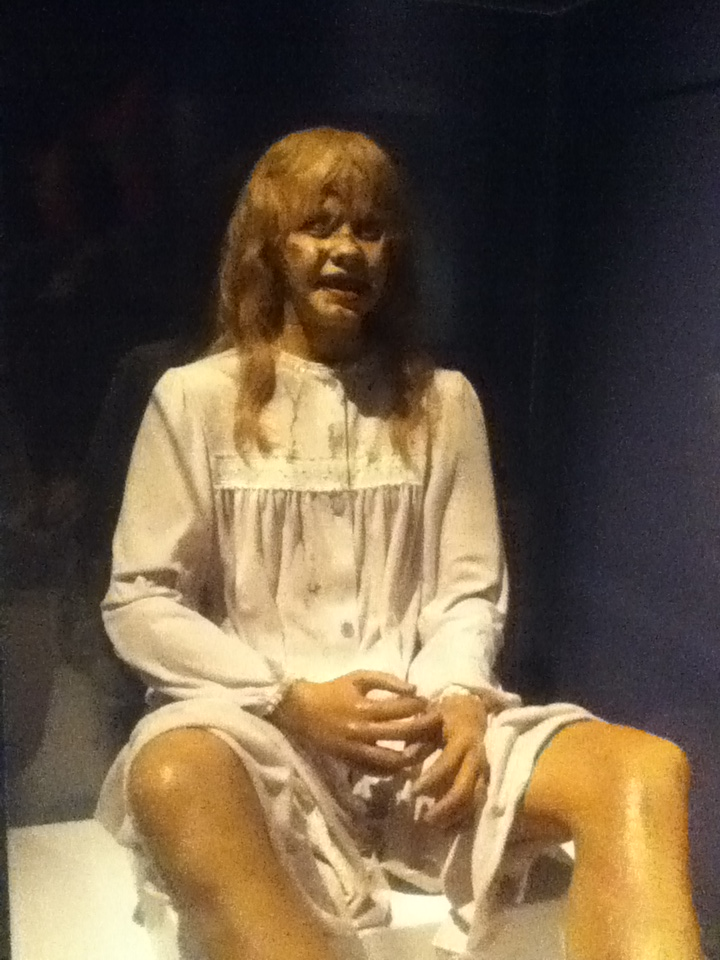
The Regan dummy

The scenes where the possessed Regan's head rotates so she appears to be looking directly backward drew notice from audiences and critics. "All I can tell you is that the way you think I did it is not the way we did it", Friedkin told Castle of Frankenstein at the time. Like the film's other special effects, it was performed live. A life-size animated dummy of Regan was built.

Critic Mark Kermode says the scene's impact results from the audience not expecting it so soon after the crucifix scene. He believes its recurrence during the exorcism was added on set since it is in neither the novel nor the screenplay. Blatty had argued against it, telling Friedkin "supernatural doesn't mean impossible". Friedkin inserted a shot of Karras, suggesting the scene might just be a hallucination. When audiences reacted strongly, Blatty said Friedkin "prov[ed] me an idiot once again".

Makeup artist Dick Smith built the latex dummy with help from effects supervisor Marcel Vercoutere. They tested its realism by putting it in the front seat of a taxicab and, when enough people were looking, turning the head. It was so realistic that Blair felt uncomfortable in its presence. They had given the dummy's face the capability to move and appear to speak, adding a condom so its throat would bulge. A tube was added for simulated breathing, which produced the requisite clouds of vapor.

==== Crucifix scene ====
Scene where possessed Regan masturbates with a crucifix, her head rotates, and Burstyn suffers her broken tailbone

While filming the scene where the possessed Regan masturbates with a crucifix, Dietz and Friedkin had "this long discussion about the right way to jerk off and I showed him why a woman has to churn her wrist [more than a man does]." At the time Friedkin said that the scene's power over audiences came from its unusual combination of sex and religion. To many viewers it lasted much longer than its 50 seconds. He had filmed much more, but ultimately decided that it was about "how much [he] could take".

The scene's power, Kermode writes, comes from Friedkin's head-on approach, centering it on a brightly lit screen, punctuating the thrusts with a stabbing sound. Blatty pleaded with Friedkin to stop "destroying the film"; Friedkin responded that the scene would be one of the film's biggest draws. When it turned out that it was, Blatty found it "terribly depressing".

==== Angiography scene ====
The angiography scene

The angiography scene, in which a needle spurts blood from Regan's neck, caused audiences the most discomfort, according to Blatty, who himself never watched it. Friedkin, too, has found its depiction of "[m]edical science impinging upon the innocence of this little girl" disturbs audiences the most, more than any of the film's possession scenes. It has been criticized as "unappetizing", the film's "most needless scene", and "revolting". British comedian Graeme Garden, who has a medical degree, agreed the scene was "genuinely disturbing"; in his review for the New Scientist, he called it "irresponsible".

Critic John Kenneth Muir wrote in Horror Films of the 1970s that the scene draws its power by merely recording what occurs and not adding anything. "It looks, sounds and feels totally real ... For a time, it is medicine that possesses Regan, not the Devil". In a 2021 article in History of the Human Sciences, Amy C. Chambers of Manchester Metropolitan University makes a similar observation. (Note: "The medical space is made spectacular and horrific in The Exorcist not through the presentation of Regan's behavior or the demon, but through the clinical nature of her treatment and how this is communicated through shots and sound.") Finnish media professor Frans Ilkka Mäyrä notes how the scientific suggests the spiritual here as "the violent movements and noises of arteriographic machinery reach diabolical dimensions" Kermode likens it to torture, "horribly sexual in its execution".

Medical professionals have described the scene, which was not in the novel but was added to the film to reflect changes in technology, as a realistic depiction of the procedure. It is also of historical interest, as radiologists were increasingly using a more distant artery instead of the carotid for the puncture. It has also been described as the most realistic depiction of a medical procedure in a popular film. In his 2012 commentary on the DVD release of the 2000 cut, Friedkin claimed that the scene was used in radiological training film for years afterward.

==== "Spider-walk" scene ====
Stuntwoman Ann Miles performed the spider-walk scene after two weeks' practice. Special effects supervisor Marcel Vercoutere had designed a special harness, but Miles did not need it due to her college gymnastic experience. Over Blatty's objection, Friedkin cut the scene just before the premiere, believing it came too early in the film. Whether the scene had been shot at all was debated by fans for years afterwards. Friedkin denied having done so until Kermode found the footage in the Warner Bros. archives in the mid-1990s while researching his book on the film. It was restored in the 2000 director's cut, albeit with a "muddy, grainy" look that one critic said made the scene seem superfluous, using an added shot showing Regan with blood flowing from her mouth.

Miles was not credited. Websites devoted to the film in the early 21st century gave credit to Sylvia Hager after the 2000 re-release. This confusion may have arisen from Vercourtere's website, where he credited her and described the harness he had designed. He said the scene was cut because the harness could not be erased in post-production. According to Miles, Hager, her lighting double, could not do the scene even with the harness, which Vercourtere had hoped to market afterwards. Since Miles was able to do the spider walk without it, she believes he left her out of his account for commercial reasons. (Note: Vercoutere died in 2013, two years before Miles' story was reported.) The misidentification, Miles said in 2018, cost her jobs afterwards since some producers believed she was falsely taking credit for Hager's work. Since then, with the intercession of SAG, she has been properly credited.

==== Special effects ====
Smith, the makeup artist, created some key special effects, particularly to make von Sydow look 30 years older in facial close-ups. Many viewers did not realize he was made up at all; critic Pauline Kael, in her generally unfavorable The New Yorker review, called it "one of the most convincing aging jobs I've ever seen". It took four hours to apply the makeup every morning. Friedkin speculated that if there was a regular Academy Award for makeup, Smith would have received it.

For the look of the possessed Regan, Friedkin and Smith drew inspiration from the crucifix scene. If she had injured herself masturbating with it, they reasoned, it was likely that under Pazuzu's control she might also have deliberately scourged her face. "[So we] decided to have the makeup grow out of self-inflicted wounds to the face that become gangrenous so that there was an organic reason for the change in her facial features, which might certainly be demonic possession, or self-immolation", Friedkin later explained. Blair wore green contact lenses meant to give her eyes a bestial appearance. A latex stomach was built for the scene where the words "HELP ME" appear on the possessed Regan's body. The letters were scratched in, and then heated to make them disappear. This was reversed in post-production so the letters seemed to appear.

=== Production difficulties and purported curse ===
Due to production problems and accidents on set, The Exorcist, originally scheduled for 85 days of principal photography, took over 200 days to wrap. The film went $2.5 million ($14.6 million in 2025) over budget, ultimately costing the studio $12 million ($69.9 million in 2025). Early on, shooting was delayed six weeks after a bird flew into a circuit breaker on the house sets, starting a fire that destroyed all of them except for Regan's room. Later, another set was severely damaged by the sprinkler system. The 10-foot (3.0 m) statue of Pazuzu was shipped to Hong Kong instead of Iraq, causing a two-week delay.

Injuries to cast and crew also affected production. Burstyn and Blair have lasting consequences from back injuries. Burstyn's occurred during the scene where the possessed Regan throws Chris backward; the take used in the film left her unable to film for two weeks and on crutches for the rest of the shoot, with a fractured coccyx. (Note: Burstyn said Friedkin never apologized to her for the incident, but they remain on good terms. He said in 2018 that she did not make an insurance claim, was not injured and did not miss any shooting. He also says doing it that way made it unnecessary to do repeated takes with less force. "I would rather have had one [take] that risked hurting her a little, not injuring her." Burstyn believes there should have been padding on her back and/or the floor.) It has caused her chronic problems due to inadequate early treatment. Blair fractured her lower spine after being too loosely strapped to the rocking bed, a take also used in the finished film. She developed scoliosis, with long-term health effects, as well as a lifelong aversion to cold from all her time in the refrigerated bedroom set wearing only a nightgown and long underwear. A carpenter cut his thumb off and a lighting technician lost a toe in different accidents.

Other people connected with the film, or their family members, died—MacGowran a week after completing his scenes as Dennings. Maliaros (Mrs. Karras) also died, like her character, before the film was finished. Deaths among the crew or those close to them included the night watchman, the operator of the refrigeration system for Regan's room, and an assistant cameraman's newborn. Blair's grandfather died during the first week of production, and von Sydow had to return to Sweden after his first day shooting when his brother died, further delaying shooting. One of Miller's sons nearly died when a motorcycle struck him. Several years after the film's release, Paul Bateson, the technician in the angiography scene, was convicted of murdering journalist Addison Verrill.

Friedkin believed there might have been some supernatural interference. "I'm not a convert to the occult", he told the horror-film magazine, Castle of Frankenstein, "but after all I've seen on this film, I definitely believe in demonic possession ... We were plagued by strange and sinister things from the beginning." Vercourtere said he "felt I was playing around with something I shouldn't be playing around with." To mollify the crew, Friedkin asked Father Bermingham, the film's technical advisor, to perform an exorcism on the set. Bermingham instead blessed the cast and crew, believing that an actual exorcism would only make the cast more anxious.

British film historian Sarah Crowther believes stories of the curse were disseminated by the studio, likening it to horror producer William Castle's elaborate marketing gimmicks. She believes most of the aspects of the curse are really just the result of Friedkin's driving, relentless production. Blatty agreed, telling Kermode that Friedkin had started the "curse" story with an interview during production in which he blamed "devils" for the film's many delays. Blatty said that "if you shoot something for a year, people are going to get hurt, people are going to die." Blair told Kermode that stories of the supposed curse circulated because viewers "chose to see a scary film, and maybe they wanted to believe all those rumors because it helped the whole process", she said. In 2000, Blatty joked that "There is no Exorcist curse. I am The Exorcist curse!" when asked if the death of Blair's pet mouse was related to it.

== Post-production ==
=== Editing ===
During principal photography, the editor then hired had no prior movie experience and was not allowed to cut the raw footage. Friedkin hired three editors—Jordan Leondopoulos, credited as "supervising editor"; Norman Gay, and Evan Lottman. A fourth, Bud Smith, recalls Friedkin asking him to work on The Exorcist after shooting wrapped, telling Smith he would be the lead. Smith asked Friedkin to let him edit one large rack of footage from the Iraq sequence and worked through a weekend to recut it to a rhythm based on the sound of a blacksmith hammering an anvil near Merrin. He also created the "flash face" trailer for the film, with a montage of faces making a strobe-like effect, under tense string music, ending after almost 90 seconds with the title. In 2018, Friedkin said that Warner Bros. feared it would scare audiences too much. He considers it the film's best trailer. (Note: In that 2018 tweet discussing this, Friedkin referred to Smith as "the film's editor", although the other three were credited.) Smith and the other three shared the film's Academy Award nomination for editing.

Friedkin felt the 140-minute-long cut was perfect, but the studio insisted he trim it to two hours to allow for more daily screenings. Blatty was willing to fight for the whole film as it was, but over his objections Friedkin cut roughly 10–12 minutes. Some of the excluded scenes (restored in some later screenings) were Blatty's favorites, including the original ending, with Dyer and Kinderman connecting and agreeing to go to the movies in the future, (Note: "It worked very well in the novel as a sort of nostalgic and upbeat ending, but I didn't like it in the film, so I cut it", Friedkin told Kermode.) and a scene where Karras and Merrin take a break from the exorcism and discuss the demon's motivation for possessing Regan. (Note: Friedkin and Blatty had argued about this scene throughout production. For Blatty the scene explains "why you've been subjected to all this horror for so long". But Friedkin felt that the audience would understand that implicitly by then.) These scenes had been in the novel, and he believed that in the movie they made it clearer at the end that good had triumphed.

=== Sound effects ===
Ron Nagle, Doc Siegel, Gonzalo Gavira, and Bob Fine created the sound effects, mixing bees, dogs, hamsters, and pigs into the demon's voice. The sound of Regan's head rotating was made by twisting a leather wallet.

Friedkin was personally involved in the four-month sound process, the last aspect of the film completed, finished just before release. Jim Nelson, whom Friedkin had hired to supervise the mixing, recalls the director being particularly demanding, treating his then-girlfriend, who was among those assisting in the process, "like a dog".

=== Alleged subliminal imagery ===
Wilson Bryan Key devoted a chapter to the film in his book Media Sexploitation, alleging repeated use of subliminal and semi-subliminal imagery and sound effects. In addition to the Pazuzu face, he claimed that the safety padding on the bedposts was shaped to cast phallic shadows on the wall and that a skull face is superimposed into one of Father Merrin's breath clouds.

A 1991 Video Watchdog article examined the claim, with stills of several uses of subliminal "flashing". "I saw subliminal cuts in a number of films before I ever put them in The Exorcist", Friedkin told the authors, "and I thought it was a very effective storytelling device ... The subliminal editing in The Exorcist was done for dramatic effect—to create, achieve, and sustain a kind of dreamlike state." In a 1999 interview, Blatty said "[t]here are no subliminal images. If you can see it, it's not subliminal."

=== Title sequence ===
The title sequence was the first major project for Dan Perri, the film title designer, whom Friedkin sought out after seeing his work on Electra Glide in Blue. His plan for the titles evolved as the film progressed. For the words themselves Perri chose to keep the Weiss Initials typeface used on the cover of Blatty's novel. The filmmakers wanted them in red, but it was hard to choose an exact shade since red tends to spill on a black background.

Perri's input into the film's opening extended beyond the credits. Friedkin told him he wanted the film to begin with a sunrise, which he had not filmed while there. The closest shot he had was one at midday, of the sun in an orange sky, with rising heat visible. Perri suggested an "implied sunrise", fading in on the sun and going from black and white to color over 30 seconds, giving the film a sense of beginning it had lacked, he said. (Note: Film scholar Kendall R. Phillips writes that that shot gives the film a subtly apocalyptic mood. "The sun appears first in an equally bright sky, but the sky soon changes, becoming darker", he writes. "The state of the cosmos has changed in these opening moments. Something dark has entered the world; a shadow has encompassed humanity." Colleen McDannell, in Catholics in the Movies, notes that the Arabic vocalization on the soundtrack is the adhan, the Muslim call to prayer, proclaiming God's greatness. As many of the film's viewers were unaware of this, she reads this as a quiet statement from Blatty that faith and spirituality are central to the narrative.)

=== Music ===
Mike Oldfield's Tubular Bells became very popular after its use in the film. Friedkin recalled in 2015 that he had wanted something like Brahms' "Lullaby" with "a kind of childhood feel". He had gone to see studio head John Calley, who directed him to the company's nearby music library. There he found Oldfield's record and persuaded the company to buy the rights.

Lalo Schifrin said that after he had written six minutes of music for the "flash face" and a working score, trailer executives told Friedkin they wanted softer music but Friedkin never told him; Friedkin rejected the score. In 2005 Schifrin said this was in retaliation for an earlier "incident" between the two. Schifrin denies claims he used his original Exorcist music several years later for The Amityville Horror. Friedkin threw away the tapes of Schifrin's score in the studio parking lot. In an interview shortly after the film's release, Friedkin said he had hired an unnamed composer "and he did a score all right, and I thought it was terrible, just overstated and dreadful." He decided instead to use the music he had given the composer as inspiration. Bernard Herrmann turned down the job after viewing a rough cut. In 1975, Herrmann said that Friedkin objected to his intention to use an organ and insisted on sharing composing credit. (Note: In the soundtrack liner notes for 1977's Sorcerer, Friedkin said that if he had heard the music of Tangerine Dream earlier, he would have had them score The Exorcist.)

Friedkin ultimately used modern classical compositions, including portions of the 1972 Cello Concerto No. 1 and Polymorphia, among other pieces by Polish composer Krzysztof Penderecki; Five Pieces for Orchestra by Austrian composer Anton Webern, and original music by Jack Nitzsche, all heard only during scene transitions. There are only 17 minutes of music in the two-hour film. Friedkin said, "What I wanted, what I think we have in the film, is understated music. The music is just a presence like a cold hand on the back of your neck, rather than assertive", an aspect praised by Judith Crist. The Greek song on the radio as Father Karras leaves his mother's house is "Παραμυθάκι μου" ("Paramythaki mou", "My Tale"), sung by Giannis Kalatzis. Part of Hans Werner Henze's 1966 composition Fantasia for Strings is played over the closing credits.

In 1998, a restored and remastered soundtrack was released (without Tubular Bells) with three pieces from Schifrin's rejected score: "Music from the unused Trailer", an 11-minute "Suite from the Unused Score", and "Rock Ballad (Unused Theme)". That same year, the Japanese version of the original soundtrack LP omitted the Schifrin pieces but restored the main theme, and the Night of the Electric Insects movement from George Crumb's string quartet Black Angels. The 2000 cut features new music by Steve Boeddeker, as well as brief source music by Les Baxter. Waxwork Records released the remastered score in 2017. They included Friedkin's liner notes with art by Justin Erickson of Phantom City Creative.

== Releases ==
=== Theatrical ===
Warner Bros. scheduled The Exorcist for release on December 26, 1973. It had been scheduled for an earlier release, but was postponed due to post-production delays. Friedkin was angry about this, believing that it hurt the film commercially. He had wanted a release before or on the holiday. It has been speculated that the studio wanted to avoid any controversy that might have come from releasing a film about demonic possession before a religious holiday. Crowther believes the studio chose Christmas to cause controversy about the film. Friedkin supposedly had seen what Paramount had done to make The Godfather a runaway success after its troubled production. He had wanted the studio to choose a more favorable release date, such as March, like Godfather.

The post-holiday release served to help The Exorcist sell tickets, as most moviegoers had time off. It was the highest-grossing Christmas week release after 1997's Titanic, and is still in second place. The Exorcist's first run lasted 105 weeks or just over two years. In 1979, the film was re-released in 70 mm, with its original 1.75:1 aspect ratio expanded to 2.20:1. A longer cut, subtitled "The Version You've Never Seen" (later re-labeled "Extended Director's Cut"), was released theatrically in 2000, with additions and changes.

=== Home media ===
A 25th anniversary special edition box set was released in 1998 on VHS and DVD, with the original ending as a special feature. Blatty was pleased that the scene was restored, saying it was "the way it ought to be seen".

"The Version You've Never Seen" was released on VHS and DVD in 2000. It was re-released on DVD and Blu-ray with slight alterations as the "Extended Director's Cut" in 2010; the Blu-Ray featured a restored version of both cuts. A 40th-anniversary Blu-ray was released in 2013, with both cuts, many previously released bonus features and two featurettes about Blatty. The Exorcist: The Complete Anthology, a box set, was released on DVD in 2006, and on Blu-ray in 2014. It includes both cuts, the sequels Exorcist II: The Heretic and The Exorcist III, and the prequels Exorcist: The Beginning and Dominion: Prequel to the Exorcist. Both the theatrical and extended versions of the film were released on Ultra HD Blu-ray on September 19, 2023, to mark the film's 50th anniversary.

== Reception ==
=== Box office ===
Warner Bros. initially had low expectations for The Exorcist, since it was a horror film without major stars that had gone well over budget. The film was not previewed for critics and initially booked for 30 screens in 24 theaters, mostly in large cities and metropolitan areas. The film grossed $1.9 million ($10.5 million in 2025) in its first week, setting records for each theater it was booked in, with an average of $70,000, equivalent to $387,000 in 2025. Within its first month, it had grossed $7.4 million ($37.5 million in 2025) nationwide; studio executives expected it to surpass My Fair Lady as the studio's most financially successful film. The huge crowds forced the studio to expand to a 366-screen wide release very quickly. At the time that releasing strategy had rarely been used for anything but exploitation films. Many theaters in large cities were not located near downtowns, where Warner Bros. had booked the Dirty Harry sequel Magnum Force before planning the release of The Exorcist. By February, The Exorcist accounted for 15 percent of the distributor's grosses in key markets.

None of the theaters booked for the initial release were in Black neighborhoods such as South Central Los Angeles, since the studio did not expect that audience to be interested in the film, which had no Black characters. After the theater in predominantly White Westwood showing the film was overwhelmed with moviegoers from South Central, it was booked into theaters there. (Note: Initially the only theater in the Los Angeles area that could be found for a second exhibitor was a small arthouse theater in Beverly Hills; as the audience for the film was at least one-third Black. Stephen Farber joked in Film Comment that the film "may have done more to integrate Beverly Hills than any civil rights action".) Black enthusiasm for The Exorcist has been credited with ending mainstream studio support for blaxploitation movies, since Hollywood realized that Black audiences did not show any preference for them. The New York Times reported that the audience lined up to see the film was between one-quarter and one-third Black at a theater on the mostly White Upper East Side of Manhattan showing the film. One Black patron said, when asked why that might be, that they "relate to voodoo and witchcraft and that kind of devil stuff ... Many still believe in black magic, especially those from Haiti and the Deep South."

The Exorcist earned $66.3 million ($336 million in 2025) in distributors' rentals during its theatrical release in 1974 in the United States and Canada, becoming the second most popular film of that year (behind The Sting's $68.5 million) and Warner Bros.' highest-grossing film of all time although it eventually became the highest-grossing 1973 release. Warner Bros. retained more of that money than usual since it released the film under four-wall distribution, the first time a major studio had done that. Under that arrangement the studio rents the theater from the owner in the initial run and keeps all the ticket revenue. Warner Bros. also did some things that had made The Godfather successful for Paramount, such as making theaters commit to showing the film for at least 24 weeks. (Note: In Easy Riders, Raging Bulls, journalist and film historian Peter Biskind wrote that Warner Bros. executives were happy but also nervous about the film's success, since its huge earnings meant that the more free-wheeling and experimental work the studio had done would give way to finding profitable film ideas and projects.) Overseas, the film earned rentals of $46 million for a worldwide total of $112.3 million ($621 million in 2025). It became the highest-grossing film in Japan with rentals of over $8.2 million in its first 11 weeks. After several reissues, the film has grossed $232.6 million in the United States and Canada, which adjusted for inflation, (Note: Based on 2009 average ticket prices.) makes it the ninth highest-grossing film of all time in the US and Canada and the top-grossing R-rated film of all time. As of 2025, it has grossed $430 million worldwide ($2.38 billion in 2025 (Note: This inflation-adjusted amount assumes constant 1973 dollars)).

=== Initial critical response ===
Upon release the film received mixed critical reviews. Stanley Kauffmann, in The New Republic, wrote, "This is the scariest film I've seen in years—the only scary film I've seen in years." Arthur D. Murphy of Variety noted that it was "an expert telling of a supernatural horror story". In the horror-film magazine Castle of Frankenstein, Joe Dante, later director of Piranha and The Howling, called it "an amazing film, and one destined to become at the very least a horror classic ... there has never been anything like this on the screen before". (Note: Another positive review, after a fashion, came from the still-unidentified Zodiac Killer. In one of his last letters to the San Francisco police, he called the film "the best saterical comidy" [sic] he had ever seen.) Roger Ebert of the Chicago Sun-Times gave the film four stars out of four, praising the actors (particularly Burstyn) and the special effects, but concluded: "I am not sure exactly what reasons people will have for seeing this movie; surely enjoyment won't be one ... Are people so numb they need movies of this intensity in order to feel anything at all?"

In the middle of the range was Judith Crist. Her New York review called the film "half-successful". She praised Friedkin's direction, its "to-the-point performances" and the special effects and makeup. But she felt that Blatty had left out what made readers connect with characters in the novel; he was also perhaps limited since the film could not leave things to the imagination as his book had. Kael called the film "shallowness that asks to be taken seriously" saying its main problem was being too faithful to the novel as Blatty had intended it. Vincent Canby, writing in The New York Times, dismissed The Exorcist as "a chunk of elegant occultist claptrap ... a practically impossible film to sit through ... [e]stablish[ing] a new low for grotesque special effects." Andrew Sarris of The Village Voice complained, "Friedkin's biggest weakness is his inability to provide enough visual information about his characters ... The Exorcist succeeds on one level as an effectively excruciating entertainment, but on another, deeper level it is a thoroughly evil film." Rolling Stone's Jon Landau called The Exorcist "nothing more than a religious porn film, the gaudiest piece of shlock this side of Cecil B. DeMille". Film Quarterly's Michael Dempsey called The Exorcist "the trash bombshell of 1973, the aesthetic equivalent of being run over by a truck ... a gloating, ugly exploitation picture". The San Francisco Bay Guardian's reviewer called it "quite simply the dumbest, most insultingly anti-intellectual movie I have ever come across".

=== Audience reaction ===
On December 26 a movie called The Exorcist opened in theatres across the country and since then all Hell has broken loose.

— Newsweek, February 2, 1974, quoted in Shock Value, by Jason Zinoman

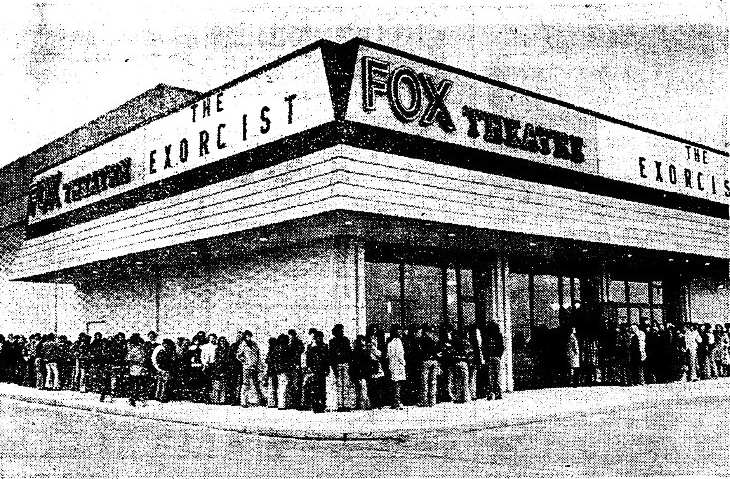
A line to see The Exorcist in Omaha, Nebraska, after its release there

Audience members screamed and fled the theater during the only sneak preview. When it was over, studio head John Calley and the other executives were stunned, but they noticed that everyone who saw it was still outside the theater talking about it. They believed the film was brilliant, but did not know how to market it, and decided on the limited early release after Christmas. Burstyn recalled watching a television news report showing moviegoers in Montreal lining up during the dead of winter at 4 a.m. in frigid weather the morning the film opened. Despite its mixed reviews and the controversies over its content and viewer reaction, The Exorcist was a runaway hit. In New York City, patrons endured 6 °F (−14 °C) cold, rain, and sleet in long lines during a normally slow time of year for the movies to buy tickets, even after having seen it once. Crowds outside theaters sometimes rioted. (Note: According to Blatty, the Kansas City police brought tear gas in case of a riot. Reportedly a Chicago crowd broke into the theater with battering rams.) The New York Times asked some of those in line what drew them there. Those who had read the novel accounted for about a third; they wanted to see if the film could realistically depict some of the scenes in the book. Another "wanted to be part of the madness". A repeat viewer told the newspaper that the film was "better than Psycho", making him feel "contaminated". Many had never waited in line that long for a movie before, or not in a long time.

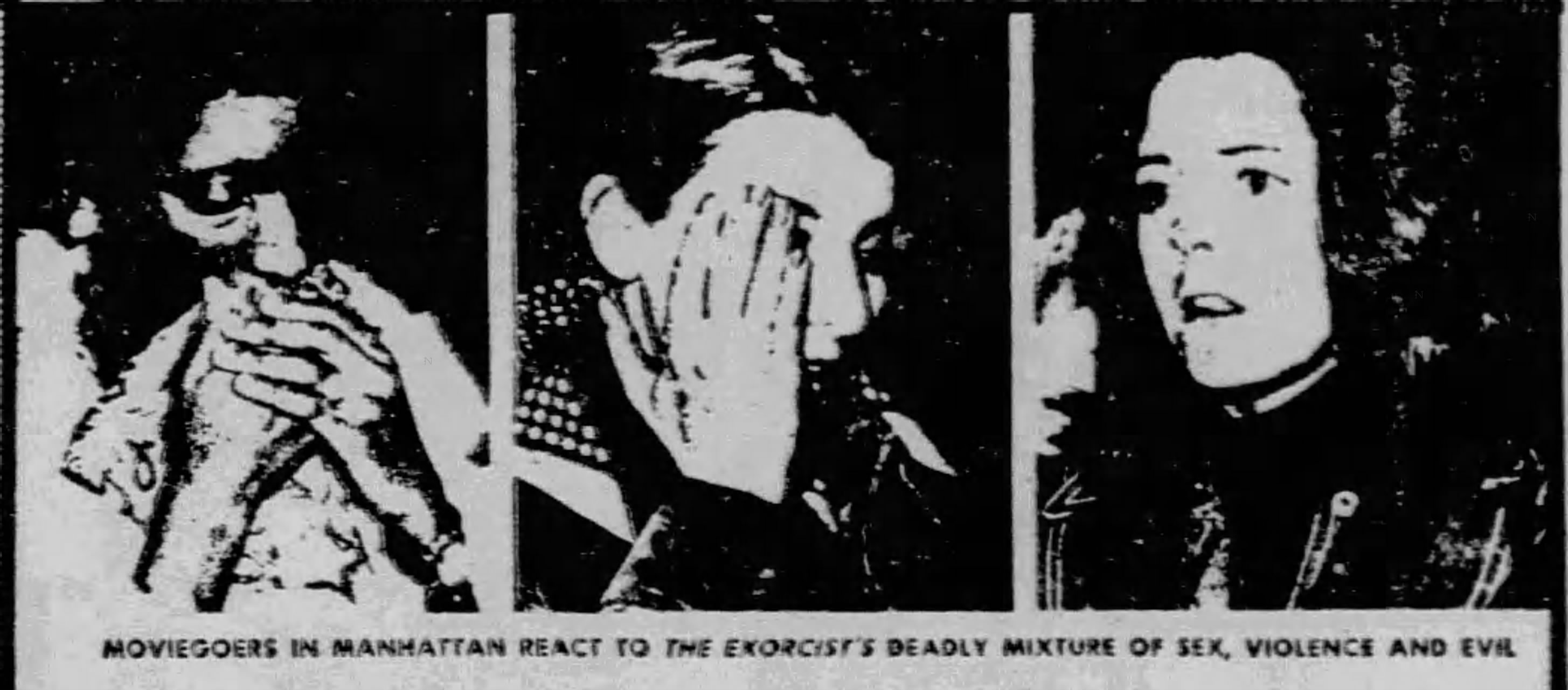
Newspaper clipping from February 1974

Reports of strong audience reactions were widespread. Many viewers fainted; a woman in New York was said to have miscarried during a showing. One man was carried out on a stretcher after 20 minutes. Nausea was frequent; a Cinefantastique reviewer recalled how the vomit in the bathroom blocked access to the sinks. The manager of Toronto's University Theater, which sold out its four daily showings, said "We have a plumber practically living here now". Viewers seemed particularly disturbed by the crucifix scenes. (Note: Some theaters were said to have provided "Exorcist barf bags". While there are no contemporary reports of providing such bags, Mad magazine depicted one on the cover of its October 1974 issue that included its parody of the film.) Some theaters arranged for ambulances to be on call. Many audience members found the angiography to be the film's most unsettling scene. (Note: Friedkin speculated that it was easier to empathize with Regan in that scene, compared to what she suffers while possessed later in the film.) Some Catholic viewers, particularly those who had lapsed in their faith but also including some priests, experienced spiritual crises. Many parishes reported callers inquiring about having an exorcism performed. The Rev. Richard Woods, a professor at Loyola of Chicago, said most of his calls were from lapsed Catholics for whom the film resurfaced their religious education before Vatican II. (Note: McDannell notes that, during the two Masses Karras says in the film, he mixes old and new elements of the liturgy, which had been revised considerably during Vatican II. She speculates that the film's Jesuit advisors were behind the change from the black vestments he wears for his mother's funeral Mass in the novel to the white chasuble he dons for the scene in the film, reflecting the council's change in emphasis from the tragedy of death to the hope of eternal life.) He said, "It stirs up memories of all those descriptions of hell that you got from nuns."

In 1975, The Journal of Nervous and Mental Disease published a paper by a psychiatrist documenting four cases of "cinematic neurosis" triggered by the film. In all, he believed scenes depicting Regan's possession had surfaced a latent condition. He recommended physicians view the movie with the patient to help identify the sources of their trauma. Other external causes were suggested. One writer at Castle of Frankenstein took note of Friedkin's pride in the film's sound, which theaters played at maximum volume, and wondered if its low frequencies had induced or amplified patrons' anxiety. Another writer there blamed the reactions on the mainstream audience's general unfamiliarity with horror-movie conventions, speculating that "these people hadn't gone to see a monster movie since 1935."

Zinoman wrote four decades later: "The Exorcist ... was one of the rare horror movies that became part of the national conversation ... It was a movie you needed to have an opinion about." Journalists complained that coverage of the film was distracting the public from the ongoing Watergate scandal. Much of that coverage focused on the audience, which, film historian William Paul wrote, "had become a spectacle equal to the film". He did not think any other film's audience received as much coverage as The Exorcist's.

=== Religious response ===
"One of the best things that could happen is if the Pope denounces it", Friedkin said. The crucifix scene, and others, involved material sacrilegious to Catholics. Officially the Church, whose influence over film content had declined following the demise of the Hays Office and the associated Production Code a few years earlier, (Note: Chambers notes that this often discouraged depictions of medical procedures, leading to the effect of the angiography scene: "[The film] provided a scientific realism that film-makers had rarely presented, or had been censored from presenting to audiences [before]".) had bemoaned Warner Bros.' choice of release date. The United States Conference of Catholic Bishops' Office for Film and Broadcasting's Catholic Film Newsletter rated the film A-IV – suitable for adults only – with reservations and gave it a generally negative review that faulted the film for suggesting exorcisms were common and possibly encouraging belief in the occult and Satanism.

Individual priests familiar with the theology were also critical. One who, like Karras, was a Jesuit and psychiatrist at Georgetown, said that while he believed in the Devil, "there is no shred of evidence from the Bible that he can possess an individual". Woods, the Loyola of Chicago professor, who had written a book about the Devil, told The New York Times that Karras and Merrin were incompetent. "They departed from the ritual in the most stupid and reckless manner", he said. "They tried to fight the Demon [sic] hand to hand instead of relying on the power of God." Eugene Kennedy, another Loyola priest and psychologist, described the film's view of the battle of good and evil as "immature ... Being a Christian and a mature person means coming to terms with our own capacity for evil, not projecting it on an outside force that possesses us."

Some non-Catholics were critical. Kael, incredulous that Georgetown and several priests facilitated the production, wrote:

Surely it is the religious people who should be most offended by this movie ... Others can laugh it off as garbage, but are American Catholics willing to see their faith turned into a horror show? Are they willing to accept anything just as long as their Church comes out in a good light? Aren't those who accept this picture getting their heads screwed on backward?

Kael nonetheless described The Exorcist as "the biggest recruiting poster the Catholic Church has had since the sunnier days of Going My Way and The Bells of St. Mary's" since the film "says that [it] is the true faith, feared by the Devil, and that its rituals can exorcise demons". (Note: Kennedy as well had compared the film to Going My Way, although derisively.) A later historian has found that the Church was not as critical of the film as reports suggested, privately considering it faith-affirming. Authorities in predominantly Muslim Tunisia banned the film before its 1975 release there as "unjustified propaganda in favor of Christianity". In 2008, Colleen McDannell, editor of Catholics in the Movies, wrote that "The Exorcist is a horror movie that believes in its villain and, even worse, recruits its villain as a witness to Catholic truth."

In February 1974, the Jesuit magazine America ran several commentaries and responses by priests to the film. The editors allowed Blatty to respond later that month. He praised some of the commentators' points, but was disappointed by some misconceptions of the film held by both critics and defenders. The changes to the film's ending from the novel, Blatty agreed, might have made it harder to perceive that "the mystery of goodness" was the theme of the work. It appeared to him that for many viewers, including some of the America writers, the film ended with the demon triumphant through the deaths of the priests despite being exorcised from Regan. The ending of the novel made this clearer, but even in the film he saw Karras's suicide as a sacrificial act of love that reaffirmed his faith.

American Protestant groups also took critical note of the Exorcist phenomenon and its religious implications. Evangelist Billy Graham told the National Enquirer that "the Devil is in every frame of that film", a remark later characterized as Graham believing the print itself was possessed. (Note: Blatty said in 1998 that despite the respect he had for Graham, "that was one of the most foolish statements I've ever heard. I would have attributed it to senility but he was only 39 or 40 at the time.") The Rev. Lester Kinsolving, an Episcopal priest and syndicated newspaper columnist, argued the Church approved the film only because its heroes were priests. The Christian Century, the leading voice of mainline Protestantism, likewise denounced the film as "hardcore pornography [that to Protestants offers] a completely impossible solution" to evil. Protestant groups around the country picketed the film and offered support to those who might be disturbed by it.

=== Rating controversy ===
The Motion Picture Association of America's (MPAA) ratings board had been established several years before to replace the Production Code. It had already been criticized for its indirect censorship; reportedly almost a third of the films submitted had been recut to avoid an X rating, which barred admission to minors. Since many theaters did not show those films and newspapers did not run advertisements for them, the X rating greatly limited a non-pornographic film's commercial prospects. While Friedkin wanted more blood and gore in The Exorcist than any Hollywood film before, he also needed the R rating. Before release, Aaron Stern, the head of the MPAA ratings board, watched the film himself. He told Friedkin that The Exorcist was "an important film" which would receive an R rating as submitted.

Some critics, reacting to reports of the film's effect on children who had seen it, questioned the R rating. In February 1974, Roy Meacham, a television critic in Washington, D.C., who had praised the film, wrote that he had heard of a girl being taken from the theater in an ambulance, even though his station regularly warned against letting children see it. Meacham said that the children she saw leaving showings "were drained and drawn afterward; their eyes had a look I had never seen before." He suggested that the MPAA had yielded to pressure from Warner Bros., and doubted MPAA head Jack Valenti's claims that the R rating was justified in the absence of sex or nudity. After a week in Washington's theaters, Meacham recalled, authorities cited the crucifix scene to invoke a local ordinance that forbade minors from seeing any scenes with sexual content, even where the actors were fully clothed. Police warned theaters that staff would be arrested if any minors were admitted to see The Exorcist. There were also reports of theaters not strictly enforcing the R rating. Meacham wrote that the board had lost its moral authority, and feared communities across the country would pass their own, perhaps more restrictive laws on what could be shown. Kael echoed his insinuations that the board had yielded to studio pressure due to the film's cost. Ebert, who had favorably reviewed the film, found the special effects unusually graphic, making it "stupefying" that it had been rated R. Stern's successor as ratings board chair, Richard Heffner, said of The Exorcist: "How could anything be worse than this? And it got an R?"

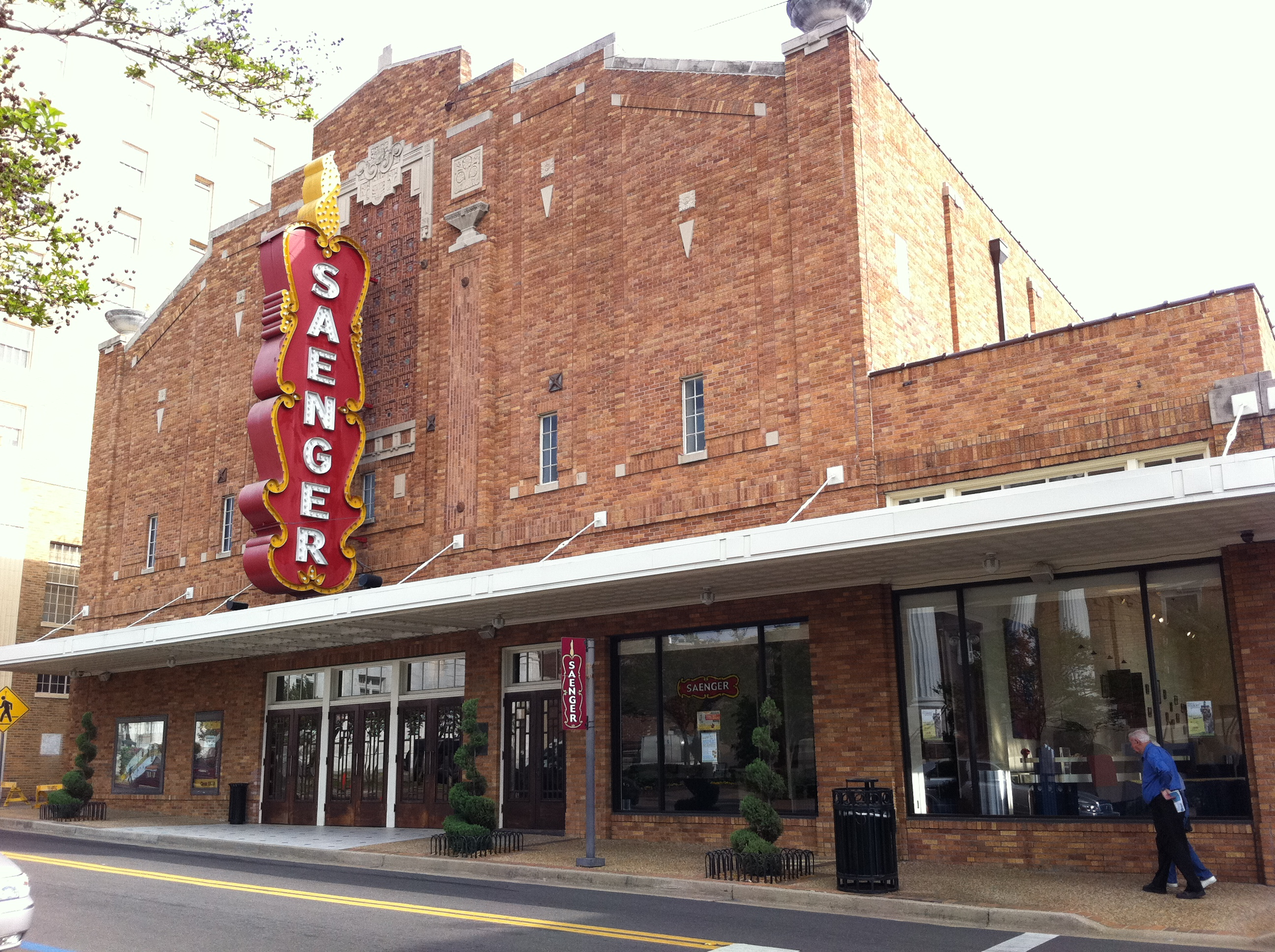
The Saenger Theater in Hattiesburg, Mississippi (pictured in 2011), was raided by police after its first showing of The Exorcist in 1974.

Boston and Hattiesburg, Mississippi, attempted to prevent showings. A court in the former city blocked the ban, saying the film did not meet the US Supreme Court's standard of obscenity. Authorities there still told theaters not to admit minors. In Mississippi, police arrested the projectionist and manager after the film's first showing; a jury convicted the theater of obscenity and fined it $100. The Mississippi Supreme Court overturned the conviction in 1976, holding the state's obscenity statute too vague to be enforceable under the 1972 Miller v. California decision.

=== Viewing restrictions in United Kingdom ===
Upon its United Kingdom release in March 1974, The Exorcist drew protests around Britain from the Nationwide Festival of Light (NFL), a Christian public action group. Local clergy and concerned citizens handed out leaflets offering spiritual support afterwards to those queuing for the film. A letter-writing campaign to local councils by the NFL led many of them to screen The Exorcist before permitting showings. It was thus banned in some areas, such as Dinefwr Borough (now Carmarthenshire) and Ceredigion in Wales.

In 1981, The Exorcist was released on home video in the UK. After the passage of the Video Recordings Act 1984, it was submitted to the British Board of Film Classification for a home video certificate. A majority voted to grant it, but director James Ferman vetoed them. He believed that, even with a proposed 18 certificate, the film's notoriety would lead underage viewers to seek it out. As a result, all UK video copies of The Exorcist were withdrawn in 1988. Following a successful theatrical re-release in 1998, the film was submitted for home video release again in 1999. It was passed uncut with an 18 certificate, signifying a relaxation of the censorship rules for home video in the UK. In 2001, Channel 4 showed The Exorcist on terrestrial television in the UK for the first time.

=== After release ===
The Exorcist's box office records stood for years. It was the top-grossing R-rated horror film for almost half a century. In 1999, The Sixth Sense beat the film as the highest-grossing supernatural horror film until It took that honor in 2017. (Note: Those rankings are based on numbers unadjusted for inflation. In 2019, Forbes writer Travis Bean recalculated the revenues of the top-grossing horror films of all time by adjusting all of them to that year's ticket prices. By that metric, The Exorcist had earned nearly a billion dollars, second only to Jaws, restoring The Exorcist to the status of all-time top-grossing supernatural and R-rated horror film.) On both charts, The Exorcist, along with The Blair Witch Project, are the only 20th-century releases in the top ten.

Since its release, The Exorcist's critical reputation has grown. On the review aggregator website Rotten Tomatoes, 78% of 177 critics' reviews are positive, with an average rating of 8.50/10. The website's consensus reads: "The Exorcist rides its supernatural theme to magical effect, with remarkable special effects and an eerie atmosphere, resulting in one of the scariest films of all time." The director's cut received an 88% rating from the same site, with a 7.30 rating, based on 82 reviews, while its consensus reading "The Exorcist has withstood the test of time, and it still has that renegade feel and the power to shock." On Metacritic, the film has a weighted average score of 83 out of 100 based on 22 critics, indicating "universal acclaim". Chicago Tribune film critic Gene Siskel named it one of the top five films of 1973. The English film critic Mark Kermode believes The Exorcist to be the best film ever made.

Director Martin Scorsese put The Exorcist on his list of the 11 scariest horror films of all time. Other filmmakers, including Stanley Kubrick, Robert Eggers, Alex Proyas, and David Fincher, have cited The Exorcist as a favorite. In 2008, it was named one of Empire's "500 Greatest Movies Ever Made". The Times put it on a similar list of a thousand films. John Carpenter listed The Exorcist as one of his top eight scariest horror classics, and said it influenced his 1980 film The Fog.

Some critics wondered, in advance of its 2000 re-release, whether The Exorcist would affect contemporary audiences, since it had been so widely imitated and emulated. The Hartford Courant's Malcolm Johnson described it as a "little old hat in 2000". Some scenes, such as Ritalin being proposed as a treatment for Regan, provoked unintended laughter. But the film's performances were still effective, and the longer version made the medical professionals seem like "witch doctors". The Tribune found it "a deeper movie now". Friedkin, an odd choice to direct at the time, now proved the best for critic Michael Wilmington, as he knew "how to convey a convincing atmosphere of modern chaos and dread". In 2022 Rolling Stone ranked the movie at No. 1 on a 101 Best Horror Movies of All Time.

=== Accolades ===
The Exorcist was nominated for ten Academy Awards and won two. It was the first horror film to be nominated for Best Picture. It won four of seven Golden Globe nominations, including Best Motion Picture – Drama. Robert Knudson and Chris Newman won The Exorcist's first Oscar, for Best Sound, thanking Friedkin, the studio and their crews, at the ceremony. Blatty won for Best Adapted Screenplay, accepting the award from Angie Dickinson and Miller, who applauded Blatty vigorously. In his short speech, Blatty posthumously thanked William Bloom, "who taught me the rudiments and the craft of screenwriting" and Friedkin. He also paid tribute to his parents, "whose love and whose courage have brought me to this moment and to this place". The next morning, Blatty complained in The Hollywood Reporter (THR) that The Exorcist had not won all the awards it was nominated for, as it was "head and shoulders, the finest film made this year and in many other years". He accused veteran director George Cukor of having campaigned against the film.

Award	Category	Nominees	Result	Ref.
Academy Awards	Best Picture	William Peter Blatty	Nominated	
Academy Awards	Best Director	William Friedkin	Nominated	
Academy Awards	Best Actress	Ellen Burstyn	Nominated	
Academy Awards	Best Supporting Actor	Jason Miller	Nominated	
Academy Awards	Best Supporting Actress	Linda Blair	Nominated	
Academy Awards	Best Screenplay – Based on Material from Another Medium	William Peter Blatty	Won	
Academy Awards	Best Art Direction	Art Direction: Bill Malley; Set Decoration: Jerry Wunderlich	Nominated	
Academy Awards	Best Cinematography	Owen Roizman	Nominated	
Academy Awards	Best Film Editing	Jordan Leondopoulos, Bud Smith, Evan A. Lottman, and Norman Gay	Nominated	
Academy Awards	Best Sound	Robert Knudson and Chris Newman	Won	
British Academy Film Awards	Best Soundtrack	Chris Newman, Jean-Louis Ducarme, Robert Knudson, Frederick Brown, Bob Fine, Ross Taylor, Ron Nagle, Doc Siegel, Gonzalo Gavira, and Hal Landaker	Nominated	
Directors Guild of America Awards	Outstanding Directorial Achievement in Motion Pictures	William Friedkin	Nominated	
Golden Globe Awards	Best Motion Picture – Drama		Won	
Golden Globe Awards	Best Actress in a Motion Picture – Drama	Ellen Burstyn	Nominated	
Golden Globe Awards	Best Supporting Actor – Motion Picture	Max von Sydow	Nominated	
Golden Globe Awards	Best Supporting Actress – Motion Picture	Linda Blair	Won	
Golden Globe Awards	Best Director – Motion Picture	William Friedkin	Won	
Golden Globe Awards	Best Screenplay – Motion Picture	William Peter Blatty	Won	
Golden Globe Awards	Most Promising Newcomer – Female	Linda Blair	Nominated	
National Film Preservation Board	National Film Registry		Inducted	
Saturn Awards	Best Horror Film		Won	
Saturn Awards	Best Writing	William Peter Blatty	Won	
Saturn Awards	Best Make-up	Dick Smith	Won	
Saturn Awards	Best Special Effects	Marcel Vercoutere	Won	
Writers Guild of America Awards	Best Drama – Adapted from Another Medium	William Peter Blatty	Nominated	

==== American Film Institute Lists ====
- AFI's 100 Years...100 Thrills – No. 3
- AFI's 100 Years...100 Heroes and Villains:
  - Regan MacNeil – No. 9 Villain

== Themes ==
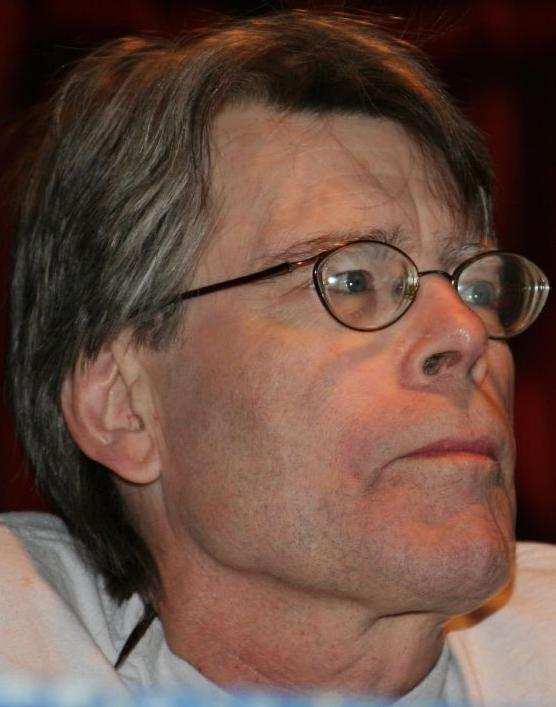
The horror novelist Stephen King describes The Exorcist as a social horror film.

Critics and scholars attributed The Exorcist's box office success to social anxiety following the cultural, political and social upheavals of the late 1960s. Amy Chambers wrote: "The Exorcist communicates an image of a United States in an unstable state of change that can no longer avoid its real and historical systemic evils". Kermode writes that by stylistically distancing itself from the more Gothic horror films of the 1960s, the film "presented a credible portrait of the modern urban world ripped apart by an obscene, ancient evil". Stephen King calls The Exorcist "a social horror film if there ever was one" in his 1983 treatise on the genre, Danse Macabre. He sees the possessed Regan symbolizing for middle-aged viewers the outspoken youth protesting the Vietnam War. Danny Peary comments on the symbolic and real fragmentation throughout the film: "With the world in such disorder, the Devil can make a dramatic entrance."

At the time of the film's release, the Watergate scandal was worsening, implicating President Richard Nixon. In 2019, The A.V. Club's Tom Breihan said that "the spectacle of The Exorcist might've mirrored" Watergate. In a Christian Century article, theologian Carl Raschke connected the "psychodramas of the American soul" resulting from "the cynical mood of our age [arising] by default from the wreck of traditional religious as well as social values". Breihan reads the film itself as reactionary, "built on reverence of tradition" despite its surface transgressiveness. He wrote that "it almost sneers at the politics of the '60s", noting Chris dismissing her film's take on student protest as "the Walt Disney version of the Ho Chi Minh story". In the only scene she is shown shooting, her character, a faculty member at the fictional college, counsels a group of protesters that change can only come from the system.

Second-wave feminism has figured in discussions of The Exorcist. At the time, the US women's liberation movement had enjoyed some early gains in legislatures and courts. Commentators have seen the film's depiction of a single working mother and her uncontrollable daughter who are rescued by patriarchal authority as a reaction against feminism. Former studio executive Peter Biskind, in Easy Riders and Raging Bulls, describes the film as "a male nightmare of female puberty. Emergent female sexuality is equated with demonic possession." For the male authority figures in The Exorcist, whether priests or physicians, Regan must be restored to her innocence through abusive and violent means if necessary. Many feminist critics, like Biskind, note the film's focus on the female body as the site of horror. "When her body changes, Regan becomes someone else; someone sexual, whose desire is a dark visitor" writes Jude Ellison Doyle in Dead Blondes and Bad Mothers: Monstrosity, Patriarchy and the Fear of Female Power. "To become a woman is to become the ... enemy of all that is pure or holy." But Australian film studies professor Barbara Creed, in The Monstrous-Feminine, which inaugurated psychoanalytic feminist film theory, counters the prevailing feminist take on The Exorcist by insisting that Pazuzu is female and thus the possession of Regan is itself a feminist act, exposing "the inability of the male order to control the woman whose perversity is expressed through her rebellious body", as she navigates an incestuous desire for her mother. University of Toronto professor S. Trimble writes that the film tapped into "white American fears of nightmare futures" that could result from the women's liberation, gay liberation and Black Power movements' challenge to the established 1970s social order. Trimble writes that, as a film about "a revolting girl revolting against the little-girl box in which she was stuck" and army of men trying to put her back, The Exorcist follows older horror movies that use gender-bending to create a monster.

Texas State religious studies professor Joseph Laycock wrote that the popular embrace of The Exorcist also pointed to reactionary popular trends in American religion. "The Exorcist is a depiction not of ecclesiastical Catholicism but of folk piety", which he also describes as extra-ecclesiastical religion, pursued by the lay masses, "incorporat[ing] beliefs about divine or supernatural intervention in the realm of everyday experience", as tolerant of Ouija boards and practices from other spiritual traditions as it was devout in its Catholic faith. In the early 1970s, organized religion in America had increasingly turned towards the rational as the country became more secular: "The authentic folk piety depicted in The Exorcist likely appealed to audiences [at the time] because it was a welcome alternative to rationalized religion and a cultural myth of universal secularization."

== Litigation ==
Lawsuits among the creators of The Exorcist began before the film was released, and continued into the 21st century. In November 1973, Blatty sued the studio and Friedkin. He demanded equal billing with Friedkin, who he further claimed had barred him from the set. Friedkin said he had only barred him from post-production; Blatty settled for the "William Peter Blatty's The Exorcist" line. In February 1974, Dietz claimed Friedkin had made her sign a nondisclosure agreement. While Friedkin had, in earlier publicity for the film, denied any use of a double for Blair, by the end of the month Dietz was saying she neither claimed to have been the only double for the possession scenes nor talked about it to the media. The Screen Actors Guild ruled her contract was not binding, but then Dietz declined to arbitrate the matter.

In 2001, following the release of the extended version, Blatty and Friedkin sued Warner Bros., alleging that they had been cheated out of profits they would receive for helping promote the film. Later that year, they sued again, alleging that the studio had further defrauded them over the last decade by failing to get full market value for various licensing deals for the film. (Note: Blatty and Friedkin were entitled to 39 and 10 percent of the film's net profit respectively. Blatty alleged that when he compared expenses incurred for the film on data from the studio sent him with similar information sent to Friedkin, the numbers on his were higher when they should have been the same. He found some of the claimed promotional expenses to be unrealistically high, and some of the overseas grosses suspiciously low. He and Friedkin also noted that Warner Bros. had sold the film's television broadcast rights to Turner Network Television (TNT), with whom it shared a corporate parent, for a far lower price than it had obtained from other broadcasters for less successful recent movies (the studio responded that since TNT still owned the rights to the 1973 version, it could easily have undermined another network's premiere by airing that at the same time). Blatty found the studio's manipulations so egregious that he made a criminal complaint to the FBI, which closed the case in 2002 after investigating it for a year.) It was settled confidentially two years later. In 2012, Blatty sued Warner Bros. again, asking for the opportunity to inspect the studio's records and accounts, to see whether he had been paid what he was owed.

== Legacy ==
The Exorcist has had a lasting effect on the horror film genre and become a cultural reference point.

=== Effect on films and industry ===
Cinefantastique wrote, "The Exorcist has done for the horror film what 2001 did for science fiction, legitimizing it in the eyes of thousands who previously considered horror movies nothing more than a giggle." Studios subsequently allotted large budgets to horror films with similar themes like The Omen, The Sentinel, Burnt Offerings, Audrey Rose, and The Amityville Horror. Horror films began to cast well-known actors, who until then had often avoided the genre in their career prime. Friedkin's use of works like Polymorphia in the score also led to the use of modern avant-garde composers like Krzysztof Penderecki in later horror films such as The Shining. Composers of original music for those films adopted some avant-garde techniques, like dissonant intervals such as tritones, sound massing and tone clusters, to create unease and tension.

The film's success led Warner Bros. to release the sequel Exorcist II: The Heretic in 1977, marking one of the first times a studio had done that with a major film not planned to have one, launching a franchise. While many classic horror films of the 1930s had spawned series of films, the practice had declined in the 1960s. Before the 1970s, most sequels had been secondary properties for the studios. The other big-budget horror films made in the wake of The Exorcist also led to sequels and franchises. Amy Chambers observes that Friedkin set a precedent not only by extensively consulting with technical experts in the subject matter, in his case physicians and priests, but foregrounding that reliance by including those experts' names and credentials in the film's credits and press kit, a practice now common.

=== Cultural reference point ===
The Exorcist has become a cultural reference point. Its imagery, particularly Regan in her bedroom, has been used by political cartoonists like Mike Luckovich and Mike Peters. In 1998, New York Times columnist Maureen Dowd wrote when criticizing the nation's apparent indulgence of President Bill Clinton's sexual indiscretions: "[P]eople are saying things so bizarre they could have come out of Linda Blair in The Exorcist. ... You expect the feminists' heads to start rotating on their necks any moment now." Father Merrin's arrival scene is another reference. In an episode of the CBS sitcom Square Pegs, Don Novello, as his Saturday Night Live (SNL) character Father Guido Sarducci, enters a classroom, similarly backlit amidst fog, to exorcise a character "possessed" by the Pac-Man video game. In an episode set on Halloween 2019, an episode of Evil, another CBS series, paid homage to the scene. In 1992, the heavy metal band Pantera named its sixth studio album Vulgar Display of Power, from the possessed Regan's riposte to Karras when he suggests she could make the straps disappear, similarly titling a book about the band's adventures on tour. In 2023 a protist that lives inside a South American termite's gut was named Daimonympha friedkini after the movie and its director.

Popular comedy took inspiration from the film. SNL parodied the film during its first season, with Richard Pryor in the Karras role and Laraine Newman as Regan. In 2023, the show again parodied the film, with host Jenna Ortega in the Regan role. Ghostbusters, in 1984, included The Exorcist among the horror films it referenced. In one scene, Sigourney Weaver's character, possessed by an evil spirit, begins to speak with a deep, husky voice and levitates above her bed as Bill Murray's character talks with her. In 1990, Blair starred as a housewife needing exorcism in the parody Repossessed.

Religious wariness toward the film abated as it became a classic. Jesuit Jim McDermott wrote in a 2019 issue of America: "The Exorcist exposed people around the world to the question of evil in a new and terrifying way ... It is a film that takes on big questions and aspires to do much more than shock." In the heavily Baptist American South, The Exorcist was seen as acceptable viewing amid denunciations of many other horror films that supposedly promoted the occult, because, as a writer in Slate recalls, it "didn't encourage people to dabble in the dark arts, they warned people. More to the point, they acknowledged the existence of God, the influence of Satan, and the truth of the Bible." British Baptist minister Peter Laws has credited the film with persuading him to abandon atheism and become a Christian, since "it suggested ... that God might be the only truly effective answer to evil, that [He] might be real and the church might sometimes be filed under 'solution', not 'problem'".

In 2015, the District of Columbia posted a commemorative plaque on the Exorcist steps, since they had become a tourist attraction. At a ceremony the day before Halloween that year, Blatty and Friedkin were present as the plaque was unveiled. Friedkin said that having his name on the plaque was a greater honor than another Academy Award, since "the Academy may come and go. Its importance has been diminished over the years anyway. But that plaque on those steps is going to be there for a very long time."

== Related media ==
=== Sequels and prequels ===
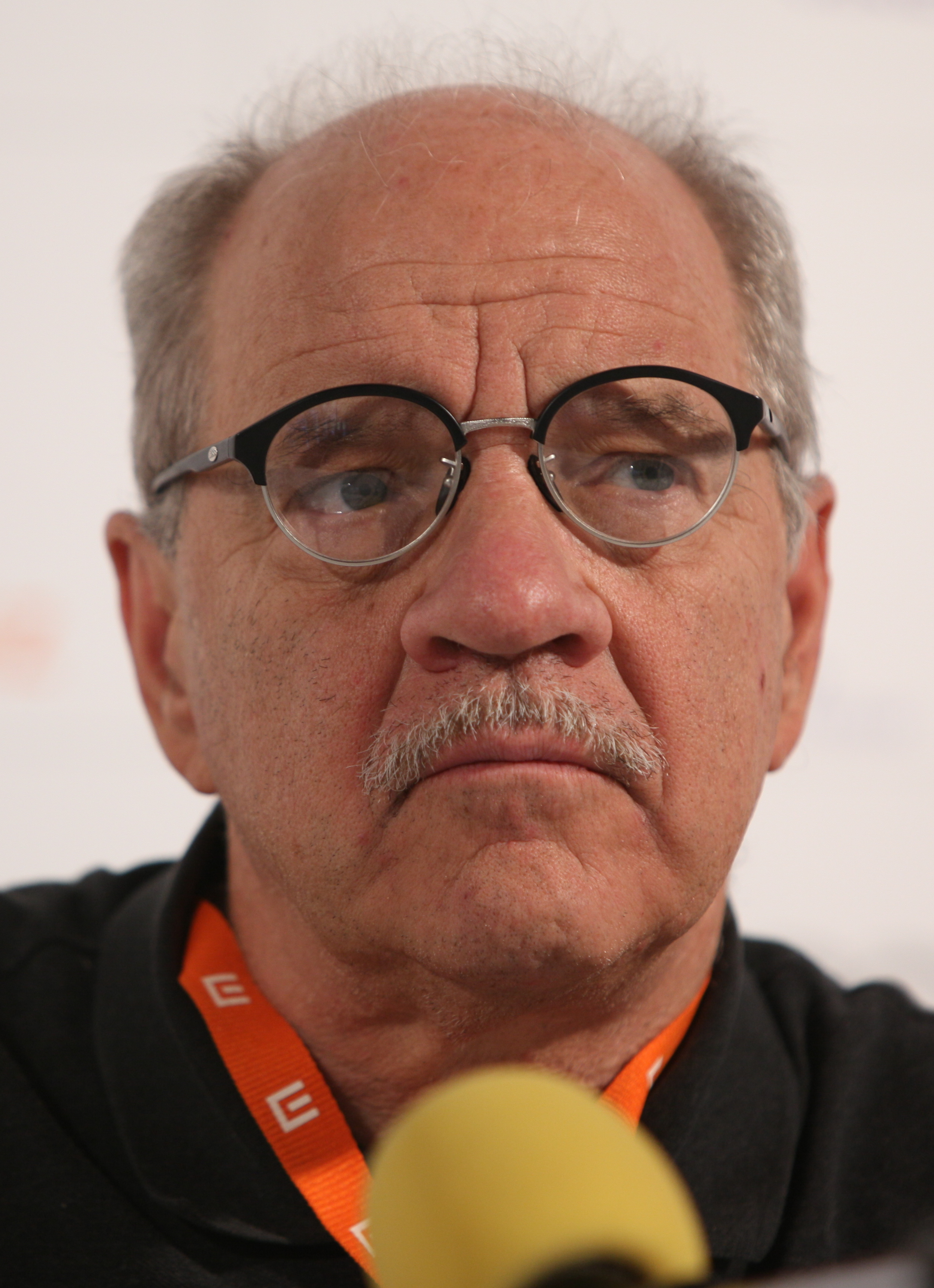
Paul Schrader in 2009

A year after The Exorcist's release, New York reported that a sequel was planned, with Friedkin producing and Blatty uninvolved. Friedkin backed out, and only Blair and von Sydow returned. (Note: The owners of the Georgetown house whose exteriors had been used as the MacNeils' refused permission to reuse it as well as the adjacent steps; sets had to be built instead.) Boorman directed and Richard Burton played the lead. The film suffered production problems, particular cast and crew health issues, and was beset by regular script rewrites and personnel changes. Upon its release in 1977, Exorcist II: The Heretic had what was then Warner Bros.' largest opening-day gross, but was less successful than the original. Afterward, Blatty and Friedkin began planning a story and script for a sequel of their own. Blatty continued after Friedkin dropped out and developed the story into the novel Legion in 1983, after Hollywood showed little interest. He saw it as an exploration of the same themes within the same fictional universe by some of the original's minor characters. The media saw it as a sequel, and it sold well. In 1990, Blatty adapted a more streamlined script from the novel for Morgan Creek Productions and 20th Century Fox, titled The Exorcist III. He also directed, with George C. Scott replacing the deceased Cobb as Kinderman. (Note: Blatty wrote a satirical novel about the experience called Demons Five, Exorcists Nothing.)

Morgan Creek and James G. Robinson, producer of Exorcist III, had commissioned a prequel story about a young Father Merrin's first confrontation with Pazuzu. It was produced in 2002, with Paul Schrader directing and Stellan Skarsgård in the lead. Robinson hired Renny Harlin to reshoot most of the film with Skarsgård and a new cast after disagreements with Schrader. Harlin's version, heavy on action and horror, was released in 2004 as Exorcist: The Beginning, and was a critical and commercial failure. Schrader's version received a limited release in 2005 as Dominion: Prequel to the Exorcist, a version Blatty found much better.

In 2020, Morgan Creek announced a reboot of the film; fans petitioned to cancel it. At the end of the year, Blumhouse Productions and Morgan Creek said that David Gordon Green would instead direct a direct sequel to the 1973 film, and later a trilogy produced by Jason Blum alongside James and David Robinson. Burstyn reprised her role, with Leslie Odom Jr. co-starring. The films would be released by Universal Pictures and Peacock, with the second and third films optioned as Peacock exclusives. The first, The Exorcist: Believer, was released in October 2023. However, following the film's very poor reception, plans for the trilogy were officially scrapped the following year and the franchise was rebooted again with The Exorcist: Martyrs from director Mike Flanagan. The film is set to release in theaters on March 12, 2027. As of March 2026, Deadline reported that Flanagan had added 11 long-time collaborators to the cast: Rahul Kohli, Hamish Linklater, Gil Bellows, Carl Lumbly, Robert Longstreet, Matt Biedel, Samantha Sloyan, Kate Siegel, John Gallagher Jr., Benjamin Pajak, and Carla Gugino.

=== Television series ===
The Fox television series The Exorcist (2016–2017) followed two priests investigating possible cases of demonic possession and performing exorcisms. In the fifth episode, Angela Rance was revealed as the adult Regan, making the series a direct sequel to the original film. It was canceled after its second season.

== Other related works ==
Blatty's script for the film has been published in two versions. William Peter Blatty on The Exorcist: From Novel to Film, in 1974, included the first draft of the screenplay. In 1998, the script was anthologized in The Exorcist/Legion – Two Classic Screenplays, and again as a standalone text in 2000.

== See also ==
- 1973 in film
- 1973 in the United States
- List of 1970s films based on actual events
- List of American films of 1973
- List of cult films
- List of film and television accidents
- List of highest-grossing films in the United States and Canada
- List of horror films of 1973
- List of films considered the best
- List of films featuring fictional films

== Works cited ==
- Andrews, Eleanor; Hockenhull, Stella; Pheasant-Kelly, Fran, eds. (2015). Spaces of the Cinematic Home: Behind the Screen Door. Routledge. ISBN 9780815396383.
- Biskind, Peter (1999). Easy Riders Raging Bulls: How the Sex-Drugs-And Rock 'N Roll Generation Saved Hollywood. Simon & Schuster. ISBN 978-0-68485-708-4. Archived from the original on April 28, 2021.
- Blatty, William Peter (2015). William Peter Blatty on "The Exorcist": From Novel to Screen. Tom Doherty Associates. ISBN 9781466834804.
- Creed, Barbara (1993). "Chapter 3: Woman as Possessed Monster: The Exorcist". The Monstrous-Feminine: Film, Feminism and Psychoanalysis (PDF). London: Routledge. ISBN 9781136750755.
- Kermode, Mark (2003). The Exorcist. BFI Modern Classics (revised 2nd ed.). British Film Institute. ISBN 978-0-85170-967-3.
- King, Stephen (1983). 1WbPRa3LoC Danse Macabre (2011 ed.). Pocket Books. ISBN 9781439171165.
- Konow, David (2012). "It's only a movie". Reel Terror: The Scary, Bloody, Gory, Hundred-Year History of Classic Horror Films. Macmillan. ISBN 978-1-25001-359-0.
- Laycock, Joseph (2009). "The Folk Piety of William Peter Blatty: The Exorcist in the Context of Secularization" (PDF). Interdisciplinary Journal of Research on Religion. 5: 3–25. ISSN 1556-3723.
- McCabe, Bob (1999). The Exorcist. London: Omnibus. ISBN 0-7119-7509-4. Archived from the original on April 28, 2021.
- McDannell, Colleen (2007). "Chapter 9: Catholic Horror". In Colleen McDannell (ed.). Catholics In The Movies. Oxford University Press. pp. 197–226. ISBN 9780195306569.
- Ilkka Mäyrä, Frans (1999). Demonic Texts and Textual Demons: The Demonic Tradition, the Self and Popular Fiction (PDF). Tampere, Finland: Tampere University Press. ISBN 9514445082.
- Muir, John Kenneth (2002). Horror Films of the 1970s. McFarland. ISBN 978-0-78649-156-8.
- Travers, Peter; Rieff, Stephanie (1974). The Story Behind The Exorcist. Signet Books. ISBN 9780451062079.
- Zinoman, Jason (2011). "Chapter Five: 'Shock or Awe'". Shock Value: How a Few Eccentric Outsiders Gave Us Nightmares, Conquered Hollywood, and Invented Modern Horror. Penguin. ISBN 9781101516966. Archived from the original on March 8, 2021.
