= Jordan Lead Codices =

Documents found in Jordan

One of the lead codices

The Jordan Lead Codices (or the Jordanian Codices) are a collection of codices allegedly found in a cave in Jordan and first publicized in March 2011. A number of scholars and a November 2012 regional BBC News investigation have pronounced them fakes. As of 2017, both the Israeli Antiquities Authority (IAA) and the Jordanian archaeological department still officially regard them as forgeries.

== Initial press reports and comments ==
On 3 March 2011, The Jewish Chronicle ran an interview with a metallurgist named Robert Feather, who it stated was trying to authenticate a collection of 20 metal books which could be linked to the Kabbalah. These items were in the possession of an Israeli Bedouin farmer named Hassan Saeda, who claimed that they had been found by his great-grandfather in a cave a century ago. It added that a piece of leather from the find had already been carbon dated to 2,000 years ago. The article reported that the Israel Antiquities Authority (IAA) considered them inauthentic and worthless, saying the books are a "mixture of incompatible periods and styles without any connection or logic. Such forged motifs can be found in their thousands in the antiquities markets of Jordan and elsewhere in the Middle East". It added that Professor André Lemaire, an epigrapher and director of studies at the École pratique des hautes études, said the inscriptions he has seen make no sense and that it was "a question apparently of sophisticated fakes".

On 22 March 2011, David Elkington issued a press release stating that a hoard of ancient books made of lead and copper, together with other artefacts, probably dating from the 1st century AD, had been found in Jordan, and that they might predate the writings of St. Paul and that "leading academics" believed they might be as important as the Dead Sea Scrolls. Elkington also stated that the items were discovered 5 years previously in a cave by a Jordanian Bedouin and smuggled into Israel, where they were at risk of sale on the black market or of destruction. Media outlets quickly picked up the story.

Elkington stated that the find consisted of "up to 70 ring-bound books (codices) made of lead and copper. Many of them are sealed on all sides. Scrolls, tablets and other artefacts, including an incense bowl, were also found at the same site. Some of the lead pages are written in a form of archaic Hebrew script with ancient messianic symbols. Some of the writing appears to be in a form of code." In the press release he stated that his team included biblical scholars Margaret Barker and Philip R. Davies.

The BBC report on the story stated that the codices had been found in a cave in Jordan sometime between 2005 and 2007.

The Daily Telegraph added that metallurgical analysis on the books, and carbon dating on a piece of leather found with the collection, suggested that the books could be about 2,000 years old, although it also questioned whether the find was authentic. Elkington, described as a "scholar of ancient religious archaeology who is heading a British team trying to get the lead books safely into a Jordanian museum", claimed that they could be "the major discovery of Christian history", and the director of the Jordan's Department of Antiquities, Ziad al-Saad, said that the books might have been made by followers of Jesus in the few decades immediately following his crucifixion.

The BBC article said that the books consist of between 5-15 leaves or plates each, about the size of a credit card, made of lead and copper, and bound together with lead rings on one side. Many of the books are also sealed with rings on the remaining three sides. Elkington reported that "In the upper square [of one of the book covers] we have the seven-branch menorah", and the text is said to be in archaic Hebrew script (Paleo Hebrew), and some in "code".

Davies noted the presence of a cross, tomb, and city of Jerusalem depicted in the books.

A news report described Barker as believing that, if the artefacts are genuine, they could be Christian texts from as early as 33 CE. A BBC report stated that a line has been translated from the text as "I shall walk uprightly".

The press release and the BBC report on 29 March 2011 indicated that the Jordanian government would make a claim for the ownership of the collection under the treasure-trove statutes of Jordanian law.

== Further developments ==
=== 2011 updates ===
A number of experts urged scepticism until further investigation could be conducted.

On 31 March 2011, a letter was published online by Daniel C. Peterson which had been written in 2010 by Elkington. The letter was to Oxford academic Peter Thonemann, sending images of a "copper tablet" and asking for information regarding the Greek text inscribed on it. Thonemann replied that the item was a modern forgery, created during the last 50 years in Jordan, because the text copied a truncated tombstone inscription (AD 108/9) from the Archaeological Museum of Amman. Thonemann said that he "would stake [his] career" on his belief that the material had been faked. Professor Jim Davila also published Elkington's letter and Thonemann's reply. In his letter to Thonemann in 2010, Elkington said that he had been told that the codices were from Egypt, not that the material was from Jordan as stated in his press release.

Also on 2 April 2011, historian William J. Hamblin called into question the Jesus image on the tablet, stating it looked a great deal like images of Helios also found on ancient coins.

On 3 April 2011, the Sunday Telegraph published an interview with Elkington. An article in The Daily Telegraph on the same day stated that David Elkington was also known as Paul Elkington, and had a book on the codices which literary agent Curtis Brown would be trying to market to publishers at the London Book Fair on 11 April.

On 4 April 2011, Philip R. Davies posted a statement on Sheffield's Biblical Studies blog suggesting that, while he recognized that the images were modern, the codices were probably not a hoax nor "forgeries". On the same day an unconfirmed report appeared, dated to 3 April, on the MEMRI Web site quoting Ziyad Al-Sa'd, director-general of Jordan's antiquities authority, as saying that the items were found in Jordan and sold on the black market to an "Israeli antiquities dealer". There was no indication of whether Hassan Saeda was meant here. Questions were also raised by Steve Caruso, an Aramaic translator, about the authenticity of the script used on the plates.

Robert Deutsch weighed in on 5 April, arguing that the tablets lacked patina and corrosion and, along with others, he noted that all the iconography and script appeared to come directly from coins dating to multiple periods (Hellenistic, Hasmonean, and Bar Kokhba) in antiquity.

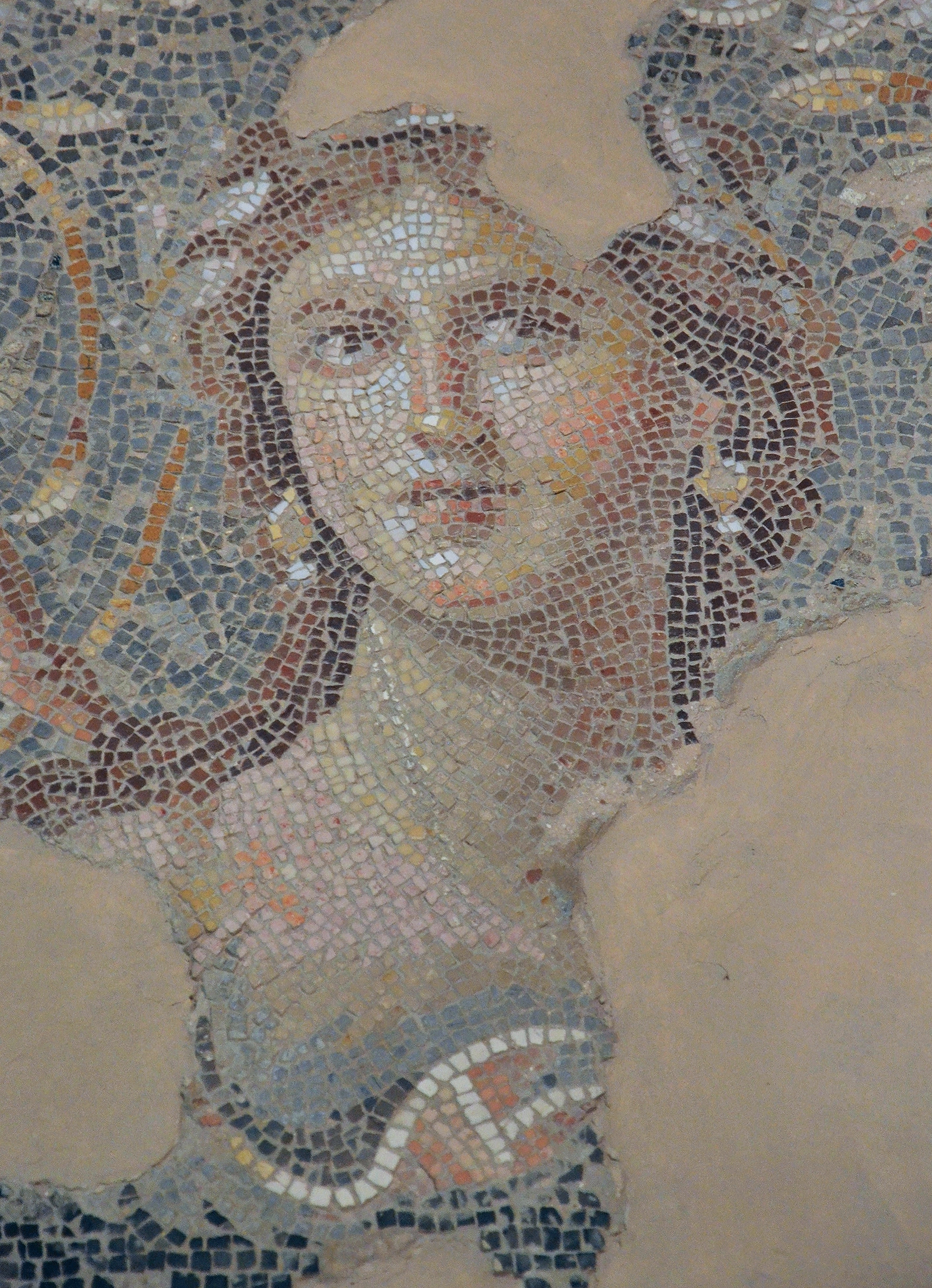
"The Mona Lisa of the Galilee". Detail from a mosaic floor in Sepphoris.

On 6 April 2011, Peter Thonemann repeated his statements about a letter from Elkington in 2010 in The Times Literary Supplement stating "a modern forgery, produced by a resident of Amman within the last 50 years or so". On 6 April The Jordan Times published an article describing the codices as a collection of 2,000-year-old manuscripts. On 6 April Dr. James E. Deitrick suggested that the image on one of the lead plates is a replica of a 3rd-century mosaic portrait dubbed "The Mona Lisa of the Galilee."

On 9 April, Prof. Jim Davila published the following summary on his PaleoJudaica blog:

The Greek is lifted nonsensically from an inscription published in 1958. The forger couldn't tell the difference between the Greek letters alpha and lambda. The Hebrew script is taken from the same inscription. The Hebrew text is in "code," i.e., is gibberish. The "Jesus" face is taken from a well-known mosaic. The charioteer is taken from a fake coin. The crocodile has a suspicious resemblance to a plastic toy. This forger was not Professor Moriarty. This forger was a careless bumbler. That makes it all the more galling how readily the media fell for the scam.

On 11 April, the Daily Express reported Thonemann's comments together with a response by David Elkington that Thonemann was not a biblical scholar but a Greek scholar. Also on 11 April, LiveScience reported that the letter forms were a mixture of old Aramaic and much younger scripts, and that the mixture indicated a modern forgery.

On 27 April, a report appeared on Yahoo! News via the Associated Press that the Jordanian police had seized seven metal codices. Further details appeared in The Jordan Times, with further claims.

In the July 2011 issue of Palestine Exploration Quarterly, Philip R. Davies published an editorial surveying some of the information surrounding the tablets, urging caution and the need for further investigation.

=== 2012 updates ===
On 26 November 2012, BBC News conducted an investigation about the authenticity of the codices. This was conducted as a 13-minute segment of Inside Out West (26 November 2012) accompanied by a written BBC News article entitled "Jordan Codices 'expert' David Elkington's claims queried". The programme initially focused on the codices' authenticity with Peter Thonemann again affirming that "I'm as certain as it is possible to be that this entire body of codices are modern fakes. I would stake my academic reputation on it" adding that "all of the codices that have appeared in the media in the past year or so are products of the same modern workshop – they’ve all sorts of similarities in style, fabric, and content. It seems absolutely clear that every single one of these documents is a modern fake". A spokesman for the Israeli Antiquities Authority (IAA) noted, "They were shown to experts on the period; all the experts absolutely doubted their authenticity." Author and metals expert Robert Feather was also sceptical.

The BBC Inside Out programme shifted focus onto whether David Elkington was the right person to be testing the authenticity of the codices, analysing the true intentions, history and qualifications of the "self styled" academic. It emerged that David Elkington has "no recognised qualifications in the field" despite previously using the title of Professor. It also emerged that Elkington is "using the codices to raise money to support him in his work" from supporters including Princess Elizabeth of Yugoslavia who has donated tens of thousands of pounds to Elkington. It also stated that Elkington plans to release a book and create a film based upon the codices and that "over the years he’s taken thousands of pounds as investment to make a film based on his theories".

=== 2015 updates ===
In March 2015, the start of the Centre for the Study of the Jordanian Lead Books, a limited not-for-profit company, was announced under the aegis of Richard Chartres, Bishop of London. The board is chaired by Margaret Barker and includes two politicians, Sir Tony Baldry and Tom Spencer. Other people involved include Professor Robert Hayward, of Durham University and Professor Ziad Al Saad as co-chairs of the "evaluation panel" and Professor Philip Davies of the University of Sheffield, Matthew Hood, Professor Bernhard Lang, Professor Yuri Stoyanov, and Samuel Zinner as other members of the evaluation panel. The centre disclaims any connection to David Elkington though his wife, Jennifer Elkington, was a board member for one day.

=== 2016 updates ===
On 8 December 2016, the University of Surrey Ion Beam Centre published a press release indicating their testing results show "the lead in the codices is more likely to be over 100 years old", and that other studies of the lead give "strong evidence that the objects are of great age, consistent with the studies of the text and designs that suggest an age of around 2000 years". In 2026, the report was published in a physics journal.

=== 2017 updates ===
On 9 March 2017, the Jordanian department of antiquities issued a statement criticizing David Elkington's activity in the country. The department said that the information Elkington was promoting on local media and at local universities was inaccurate and lacked objectivity, and that there was no evidence to support the codices' authenticity. The Jordan Times reported that

The department described the findings of David Elkington as baseless, stressing that the cave was not found and the pictures he has have nothing to do with the cave that was visited, which indicates that his insistence on the originality of the codices is groundless and not credible. Jamhawi [the antiquities department director] said that modern technology can be used to create confusion since it can use old materials and draw on it to make almost unrecognizable fake antiquities. The DoA chief called for taking information from authorities, noting that the DoA would inform the public of solid data about their national heritage as long as they were proven authentic.

The Elkingtons still maintain that the codices are credible and are 2000 years old.

== See also ==
- Golden Orphism Book, three golden plates supposed to contain Etruscan writing
- Mormonism and engraved metal plates
- Gospel of Barnabas
- The Centre for Study of The Jordanian Lead Books
