= Shock value (disambiguation) =

Shock value is the potential of an action, image, text, or other form of communication to provoke a reaction of disgust, shock, anger, or fear.

Shock Value may also refer to:

- Shock Value (Timbaland album), 2007
  - Shock Value II, a 2009 follow-up
- Shock Value (Twelve Gauge Valentine album), 2006
- Shock Value (book), a 2011 book by Jason Zinoman
- Shock Value, a book by John Waters
- Shock Value, a 2014 film starring Malcolm McDowell
- "Shock Value" (Murdoch Mysteries), a 2021 television episode
