= Interpretation (journal) =

- Discipline: Biblical studies
- Language: English
- Edited by: Samuel L. Adams

Publication details
- History: 1947-present
- Publisher: SAGE Publications on behalf of the Union Presbyterian Seminary
- Frequency: Quarterly

Standard abbreviations
- ISO 4: Interpretation

Indexing
- ISSN: 0020-9643 (print); 2159-340X (web)
- LCCN: 49048943
- OCLC no.: 1715998

Links
- Journal homepage; Online access; Online archive

Interpretation is a quarterly peer-reviewed academic journal that covers the field of biblical studies. The editor-in-chief is Samuel L. Adams (Union Presbyterian Seminary). It was established in 1947 and is published by SAGE Publications.

== Abstracting and indexing ==
The journal is abstracted and indexed in:

- Children's Book Review Index
- Guide to Social Science & Religion in Periodical Literature
- International Review of Biblical Studies
- New Testament Abstracts
