= Golden Orphism Book =

Etruscan inscribed gold sheets (c. 660 BCE)

- Material: 23.82-karat gold
- Height: 5 cm (excluding rings)
- Width: 4.5 cm
- Weight: 100 grams
- Created: 660 BCE
- Discovered: 1943/1955, Struma, Bulgaria
- Present location: National Historical Museum, Sofia, Bulgaria
- Language: Etruscan

The Golden Orphism Book (Bulgarian: Златна орфическа книга), also known as the Etruscan Gold Book, is a Thracian artefact consisting of six connected sheets of gold.

The small sheets contain writing identified as Etruscan, together with images of two people carrying a large vessel; a horned animal; a horse and its helmeted rider; a musical instrument, perhaps a lyre; a siren; and two people carrying shields. Inscribed leaves of gold known as Totenpässe were associated with the Orphic religion, hence the modern name of the artefact.

Two golden rings pass through holes in each sheet, connecting them, and are themselves joined to a third ring. A date of 660 BCE has been associated with the artifact, based on the stylistic evidence of the letterforms and images. If confirmed, this would make it the earliest surviving example of a codex, that is, a bound book; however, some argue that this only applies to folded sheets.

The artifact is said to have been discovered in either 1943 or 1955 in the area of the Struma river in Bulgaria. Its subsequent whereabouts are not known, but in 2003, the elderly discoverer donated it anonymously to the National Historical Museum (NIM) in Sofia.

Museum director Bojidar Dimitrov asserted that the book's authenticity had been 'confirmed by two experts in Sofia and London', according to a BBC report derived from the French news agency AFP, but neither expert was named.

It was reported in 2022 that the Museum was preparing a publication about the artifact.

Related plates

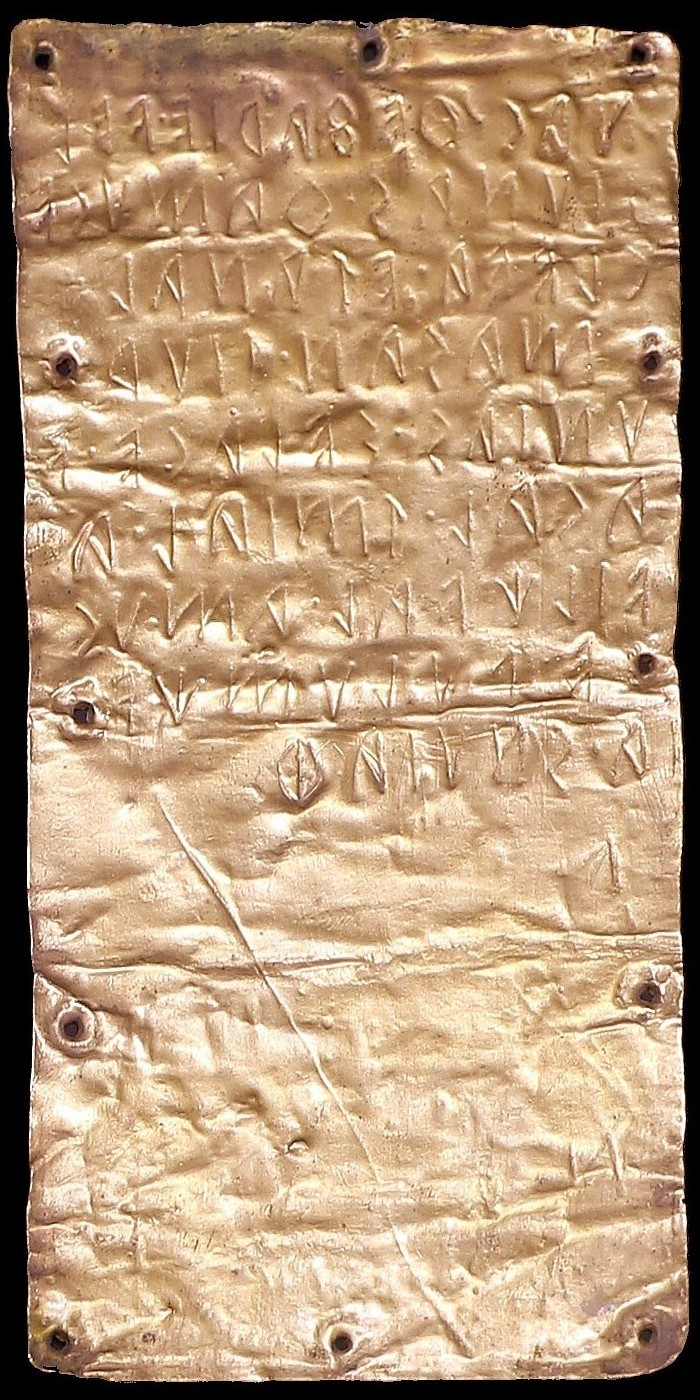
A sheet from the Pyrgi Tablets, c. 500 BCE), with Etruscan characters

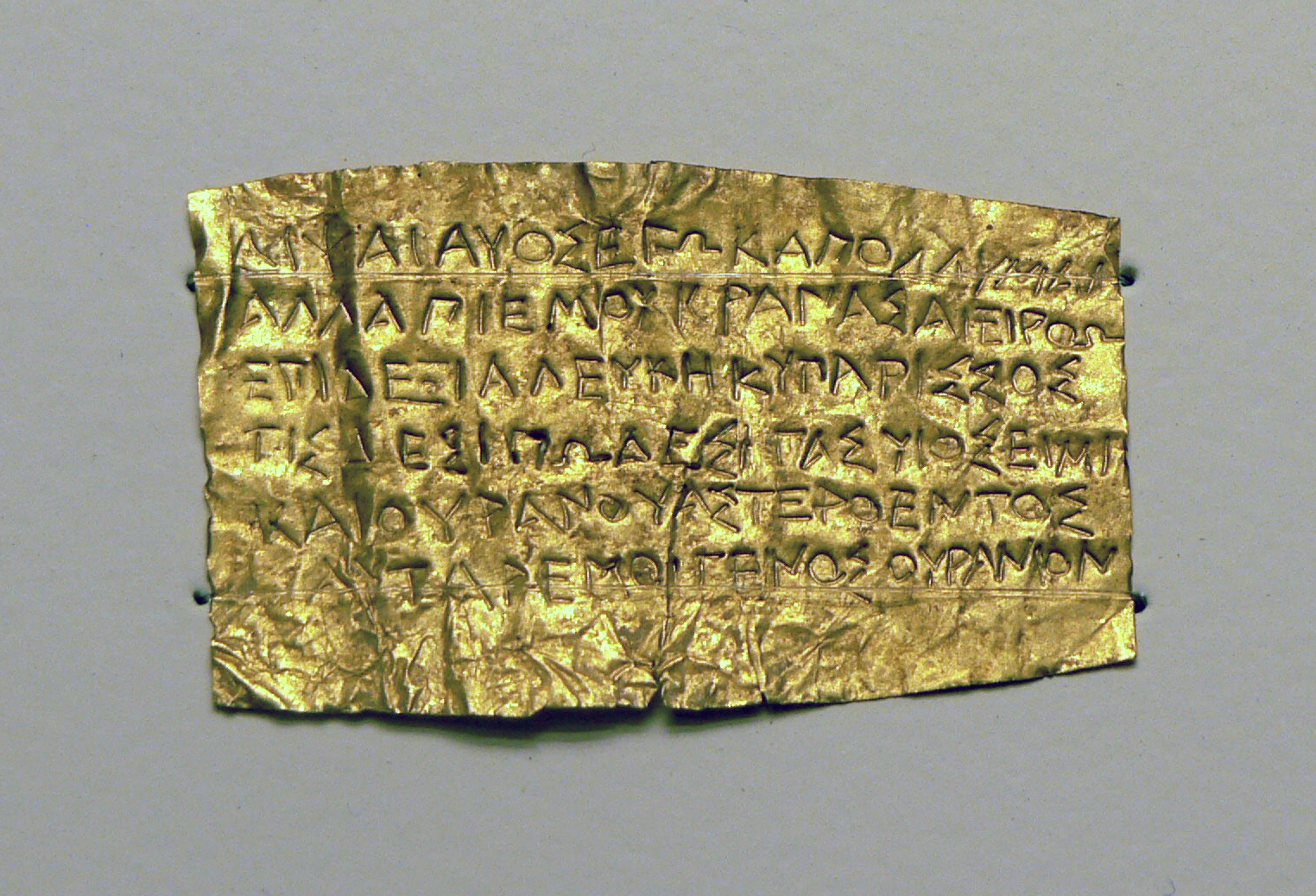
Lamella Orphica (Getty Museum), mid-4th century BCE, with Greek characters

== See also ==
- Pyrgi Tablets, three golden plates with text in Phoenician and Etruscan (c. 500 BCE)
- Derveni papyrus, fragments of a scroll dated to c. 340 BCE and identified by UNESCO as 'the oldest book of Europe'
- List of oldest documents
- Jordan Lead Codices, metal books claimed to date from the 1st century CE, considered forgeries
- Lead Books of Sacromonte, metal sheets wired together and discovered in Spain around 1600, are considered forgeries.
- Sinaia lead plates, metal sheets inscribed in Greek characters, considered forgeries.
