= Colleen McDannell =

American historian (born 1954)

- Born: November 28, 1954 (age 71); Detroit, Michigan, U.S.
- Occupation: Historian
- Awards: Guggenheim Fellowship (2000)

Academic background
- Education: University of Colorado, Boulder; University of Denver; Temple University
- Thesis: The home as sacred space in American Protestant and Catholic popular thought, 1840-1900 (1984)

Academic work
- Discipline: History of religion
- Sub-discipline: Catholicism; Mormonism; Religion in media
- Institutions: University of Maryland Global Campus; University of Mannheim; University of Utah

Colleen McDannell (born November 28, 1954) is an American historian of religion. A 2000 Guggenheim Fellow, she is author of The Christian Home in Victorian America: 1840‑1900 (1986), Heaven: A History (1988), Picturing Faith: Photography and the Great Depression (2004), and The Spirit of Vatican II (2011), and she won the Organization of American Historians' 2019 Mary Nickliss Prize in U.S. Women's and/or Gender History for her book Sister Saints: Mormon Women since the End of Polygamy. She is Professor of History and Sterling M. McMurrin Professor of Religious Studies at the University of Utah.

== Biography ==
Colleen McDannell was born on November 28, 1954 in Detroit. She attended the University of Colorado, Boulder, where she graduated magna cum laude with a BA in 1975; the University of Denver, where she got an MA in 1978; and Temple University, where she got a PhD in 1984. Her doctoral dissertation was The home as sacred space in American Protestant and Catholic popular thought, 1840-1900. All three degrees were in religious studies.

After working as a visiting assistant professor of religious studies at UC Boulder (1984-1985), McDannell worked as an American history lecturer at University of Maryland Global Campus Europe (1985-1988) and as an American studies lecturer at the University of Mannheim (1988-1989). In 1989, she moved to the University of Utah, where she started as Sterling M. McMurrin Professor of Religious Studies and associate professor of history. In 1996, she was promoted to full professor.

McDannell has written several books and articles related to the history of Christianity, Mormon studies, and religion in film and photography, including The Christian Home in Victorian America: 1840‑1900 (1986), Heaven: A History (1988), and Picturing Faith: Photography and the Great Depression (2004). She edited the 2008 volume Catholics in the Movies, and she authored a 2020 Images of America book called Catholic Utah.

In 1989, McDannell received an honorable mention from the Catholic Press Association for her U.S. Catholic Historian article "The Devil Was the First Protestant': Gender and Intolerance in Irish Catholic Fiction". In 2000, she was awarded a Guggenheim Fellowship "for a study of religious America in government photography, 1935-1943". At UU, she teaches several courses related to religious studies. She won the Organization of American Historians' 2019 Mary Nickliss Prize in U.S. Women's and/or Gender History for her book Sister Saints: Mormon Women since the End of Polygamy.

McDannell was a 1991 Cushwa Center for the Study of American Catholicism Fellow at Notre Dame University and a 1992 Indo-American Fellow at the Council for International Education. She was a Fulbright Fellow twice: in 1992 at Mahatma Gandhi University, Kerala and Mother Teresa Women's University and in 2000 at the University of Groningen. She was the 2000 John Adams Chair in American History at the University of Groningen, the 2003 Dickinson Distinguished Visitor at Dartmouth College, and the 2004 Walter Capps Visiting Professor of Religious Studies at University of California, Santa Barbara.

== Works ==
- The Christian Home in Victorian America, 1840-1900 (1986) (Note: Reviews of this book:)
- (with Bernhard Lang) Heaven: A History (1988) (Note: Reviews of this book:)
- Material Christianity: Religion and Popular Culture in America (1995) (Note: Reviews of this book:)
- (ed.) Religions of the United States in Practice (2001)
- Picturing Faith: Photography and the Great Depression (2004) (Note: Reviews of this book:)
- (ed.) Catholics in the Movies (2008)
- The Spirit of Vatican II: A History of Catholic Reform in America (2011) (Note: Reviews of this book:)
- Sister Saints: Mormon Women Since the End of Polygamy (2019)
