= International Review of Biblical Studies =

- Discipline: Biblical studies
- Language: English
- Edited by: Bernhard Lang

Publication details
- Former name(s): Internationale Zeitschriftenschau für Bibelwissenschaft und Grenzgebiete
- History: Ceased publication in 2011
- Publisher: Brill (Netherlands)
- Frequency: Annually

Standard abbreviations
- ISO 4: Int. Rev. Biblic. Stud.

Indexing
- ISSN: 0074-9745

Links
- Journal homepage

The International Review of Biblical Studies was an annual academic journal of biblical studies. It was published by Brill. Its editor was latterly Bernhard Lang.
