= Bernhard Lang (biblical scholar) =

Biblical scholar (born 1946)

- Born: 12 July 1946 (age 80); Stuttgart

Academic background
- Education: University of Tübingen

Academic work
- Discipline: Biblical studies Cultural history
- Institutions: University of Tübingen; University of Paderborn; University of St Andrews; Sorbonne University
- Notable works: The Hebrew God: Portrait of an Ancient Deity; Joseph in Egypt: A Cultural Icon from Grotius to Goethe; Sacred Games: A History of Christian Worship

Bernhard Lang is a German biblical scholar and cultural historian born in 1946.

== Life ==
For many years he taught at the University of Paderborn, with which he has been associated since 1985. He was also Professor of Divinity at the University of St Andrews from 1997 to 2003.

He is perhaps best known as the author of The Hebrew God: Portrait of an Ancient Deity (2002), Joseph in Egypt: A Cultural Icon from Grotius to Goethe (2009), and Sacred Games: A History of Christian Worship (2013), which were published by Yale University Press, as was Heaven: A History (2001), of which he was a co-author together with Colleen McDannell. Another work, Meeting in Heaven, was published by Peter Lang in 2011. In conjunction with the Society for Old Testament Study (of which he is an Honorary Member) a volume of his essays entitled Hebrew Life and Literature was published in 2008 by Ashgate Publishing and subsequently republished by Routledge.

He was formerly the editor of the International Review of Biblical Studies, and was awarded an honorary degree of Doctor of Theology by Aarhus University in 2008.
