= Shock Value (book) =

- Author: Jason Zinoman
- Language: English
- Subject: Film criticism
- Published: 2011 (The Penguin Press)
- Publication place: United States
- Media type: Print
- Pages: 274
- ISBN: 978-1-59420-302-2

Shock Value: How a Few Eccentric Outsiders Gave Us Nightmares, Conquered Hollywood, and Invented Modern Horror is a 2011 American book by Jason Zinoman. It traces the evolution of horror films as they began to focus on more reality-based, less campy subjects during the late 1960s and early 1970s.

== Background ==
The book grew out of an article Zinoman wrote for Vanity Fair in 2007. Over four years, Zinoman collected interviews with filmmakers, and, after interviewing family and friends, returned to the filmmakers again, to find new, fresh topics for interviews. Zinoman also researched stories he heard repeated from multiple sources, such as the former friendship between John Carpenter and Dan O'Bannon, both of whom were responsible for important horror films in the 1970s. To differentiate the clashing styles of horror filmmaking that took place in the 1960s, Zinoman used the terms "Old Horror" and "New Horror". These are borrowed from a 1979 Harper's Magazine article written by Ron Rosenbaum. Zinoman defines Old Horror as being campy films focused on stars, while New Horror is more politically aware, realistic, and focused on directors. New Horror also has what Zinoman describes as a "postmodern sensibility of evil", where antagonists have no discernible motive. Zinoman says that films like Targets offer commentary on this change-over.

== Reception ==
Cynthia C. Scott of Bright Lights Film Journal wrote that the book "lacks the epic scope" of other New Hollywood histories, but it offers compelling arguments to take the discussed films seriously. Ty Burr of The New York Times praised the book's research but wrote it "struggles to bring the larger picture into focus". Matthew Hays of The Globe and Mail called it "crucial reading for any serious horror aficionado". Zack Handlen of The A.V. Club rated it A− and wrote that the book's only flaw is that it should have been longer. Ryan Daley of Bloody Disgusting rated it 5/5 stars and described it as "the most effortlessly enchanting treatise on the American horror film since Stephen King's Danse Macabre".
