= Tanacu exorcism =

Demonic possession case

The Tanacu exorcism was a case in which Maricica Irina Cornici, an allegedly mentally ill nun at the Romanian Orthodox Church monastery of Tanacu in Vaslui County, Romania, was ruled to have been killed during an exorcism in 2005 led by Father Daniel Petre Corogeanu and four Orthodox Christian nuns who were a part of the Order of the Holy Trinity. The case was widely publicized in the Romanian media and following a lengthy trial, the priest was sentenced on appeal to 7 years, one nun to 6 years and the other three nuns to 5 years; however, many of Tanacu's residents, including Cornici's brother, believed her to have suffered from demonic possession. The coroner Dan Gheorghiu maintained that the nun's cause of death was due to an overdose of adrenaline given in the ambulance.

== Background ==
In the aftermath of the Romanian Revolution of December 1989, the Socialist Republic of Romania, which officially promoted state atheism, collapsed, resulting in the end of the persecution of Christians in Communist Romania, as well as the revival of Christian monasticism in the country. In January 2005, 23-year-old Maricica Irina Cornici moved to the Tanacu monastery. She was born into a broken family, and, following her father's suicide, she and her brother grew up in an orphanage. When she was 19, she worked as a nanny in Germany, and then for a family in Banat. A friend of hers from the orphanage became a nun at the Tanacu monastery and she encouraged her to also become a nun.

Soon after, she began giggling during Mass and, by April, her mental state deteriorated and the doctors at the local psychiatric hospital diagnosed her disease as schizophrenia. After a two-week treatment, they released her into the care of the monastery. Cornici's friends also stated that she never exhibited any signs of mental illness. Her brother testified that he was with her when he saw Satan go "into her" and also maintained that she suffered from demonic possession.

Daniel Petre Corogeanu was the 29-year-old priest of the monastery. A decade before the events, he was a football player in Vaslui, his home town. He began following religious studies at the University of Iași after he could not secure admission in University of Bucharest, where he wanted to study sports or law. A year later, a businessman from his home town recruited him to help build a monastery in the hills near the city. He was ordained by the local bishop, who expected that he would continue his studies. Nevertheless, he gave up his university education in order to devote himself to running the monastery.

In 2003, Father Corogeanu had some disputes with the diocese. When the bishop came to read him the canon law, he argued that the rules were "19th century innovations" made by the Freemasonry. The original community of monks dissolved as they left to become priests and, instead, Corogeanu organized a community of nuns, who were, according to all accounts, "completely devout to him".

== The exorcism ==
Father Corogeanu thought that it was not just a mental illness, but rather that Cornici was possessed by Satan. He would later claim that "you can't take the Devil out of people with pills" and that an exorcism was necessary.

In order to restrain her from violent movements including those causing her to hit herself, the nuns bound her hands and feet and locked her in her room as they participated in the liturgy commemorating the Ascension of Jesus. A few days later, they chained her to a cross with her arms stretched and carried her into the church so that they could anoint her. According to Sister Nicoleta Arcalianu, Cornici had been restrained in the same manner that others who were demonically possessed were; Sister Arcalianu stated that had Cornici not been restrained, she "could have either killed herself or killed someone else". With regard to Cornici, Sister Arcalianu stated that "Irina knew that she was possessed by evil spirits because she was begging us to tie her up and help her."

Her wrists and forehead were then anointed with holy oil and she was kept in the church for three days. They put a towel into her mouth to stop her from cursing and prayed to cast out the Devil as they wet her lips with holy water.

Cornici was then moved to her room and untied. She was, according to Father Corogeanu, "cured". She was later given bread and tea, and fainted after eating. The nuns could not awaken her, and feeling that her pulse was weak, they called an ambulance. While in the ambulance, she was administered six doses of adrenaline. By the time she reached the hospital, she was dead.

== Aftermath ==
The police were notified by the doctors at the hospital, who noticed the marks left on her wrists and ankles by the chains. The 2005 autopsy claimed that she had died of dehydration, exhaustion and a lack of oxygen.

Father Corogeanu and the four nuns who helped him were charged with murder and depriving a person of liberty. Prosecutors sought a life sentence for Corogeanu, but he was sentenced in 2007 to 14 years in prison, while the nuns (Nicoleta Arcalianu, Adina Cepraga, Elena Otel, and Simona Bardanas) were sentenced to between 5 and 8 years. Many individuals were present in the courtroom to support Father Corogeanu, and were distraught at the pronouncement of the verdict. The Court of Appeals reduced his sentence to 7 years, and Corogeanu was freed on parole in November 2017, after serving two-thirds of his punishment.

As Maricica Irina Cornici was lowered into her grave during her funeral, "claps of thunder were heard", leading Corogeanu to conclude "that the will of God has been done".

The Romanian Orthodox Church closed down the monastery and had Corogeanu defrocked.

In 2014, Coroner Dan Gheorghiu said "'I was part of the team who handled the exhumation of the nun's body. ... It was concluded that the woman died of an overdose of adrenaline. Don't ask me, I don't know why the judges did not take that into account." Fr. Corogeanu stated that "My biggest mistake was that I called the ambulance when I saw she was not moving. I think she died because the medics who came with the ambulance tried to resuscitate her by giving her too much adrenaline. Had I not called the ambulance, she would have been well now."

In Tanacu, many people continue to maintain that Cornici was indeed possessed, rather than mentally ill, and that Corogeanu did his best to help her.

The 2012 movie Beyond the Hills directed by Cristian Mungiu was based on the novels written by Tatiana Niculescu Bran, and inspired by the Tanacu case. The Crucifixion, released in 2017, is also based on the Tanacu exorcism.

== See also ==
- Exorcism in Christianity
- Clara Germana Cele
- Johann Blumhardt
- Michael Taylor (Ossett)
