= Alan Rumsey =

Alan Rumsey is an Emeritus Professor of Anthropology at the School of Culture, History & Language in the College of Asia and the Pacific at the Australian National University. He is a linguistic anthropologist known for his ethnographic and linguistic fieldwork in Melanesia and Aboriginal Australia.

== Education ==
Rumsey earned all his degrees from the University of Chicago. He received a Bachelor of Arts in Anthropology in 1972, followed by a Master of Arts in 1975, and a Doctorate in Anthropology and Linguistics in 1978. He also attended Atlantic College in South Wales, U.K. from 1967 to 1968.

== Career ==
In 1978, Rumsey began his academic career as a lecturer in the Department of Anthropology at the University of Sydney. He became a Senior Lecturer in 1985. He moved to the Australian National University as a Senior Lecturer in the Department of Linguistics in 1995, and linguistic anthropology in the College of Asia and the Pacific, where he was a Fellow from 1996 to 2001, Senior Fellow in 2001, and Professor and Head of department in 2011. He held an Australian Research Council (ARC) Discovery Outstanding Researcher Award (DORA) Professorship from 2013 to 2017 before becoming emeritus professor.

== Research ==
Rumsey has conducted fieldwork in two regions: the Kimberley region of Western Australia (on the Bunuba and Ungarinyin languages) and the Nebilyer Valley in the Western Highlands of Papua New Guinea (on the Ku Waru language, a variety of Mbo Ung).

Rumsey co-edited a special issue of Anthropological Quarterly with Joel Robbins on "Anthropology and the opacity of other minds." He has examined how Ku Waru speakers who hold that one cannot fully know another's thoughts, use linguistic practices to manage social interaction and deception.

Rumsey has analyzed tom yaya kange which is a genre of metrical sung tales from the Ku Waru region. He has described how the genre transforms everyday Ku Waru speech to fit melodic and poetic constraints, including the reduction of syntactic units to map onto isometric lines, and allows for the systematic use of poetic parallelism.

Rumsey directs the project "Body, Language and Socialization across Cultures," funded by the ARC and ANU. Using video recordings from Ku Waru, among other topics he and collaborators have studied how adults use prompting routines to elicit repetitions from children, examining how these routines contribute to linguistic, social, and self-personal development.

== Selected publications ==
- Rumsey, Alan; Merlan, Francesca (1991). Ku Waru: Language and Segmentary Politics in the Western Nebilyer Valley, Papua New Guinea. Cambridge University Press.
- Rumsey, Alan; Weiner, James, eds. (2001). Emplaced Myth: Space, Narrative, and Knowledge in Aboriginal Australia and Papua New Guinea. University of Hawai'i Press.
- Rumsey, Alan; Weiner, James, eds. (2004). Mining and Indigenous Lifeworlds in Australia and Papua New Guinea. Sean Kingston Publishing.
- Rumsey, Alan; McGregor, William B. (2009). Worrorran Revisited: The Case for Genetic Relations among Languages of the Northern Kimberley Region of Western Australia. Pacific Linguistics.
- Rumsey, Alan; Niles, Don, eds. (2011). Sung Tales from the Papua New Guinea Highlands: Studies in Form, Meaning, and Social Context. ANU Press.
- Rumsey, Alan (1990). "Wording, Meaning, and Linguistic Ideology". American Anthropologist 92 (2): 346–361.
- Rumsey, Alan (2000). "Agency, Personhood and the 'I' of Discourse in the Pacific and Beyond". Journal of the Royal Anthropological Institute 6 (1): 101–115.
- Rumsey, Alan (2001). "Tom Yaya Kange: A Metrical Narrative Genre from the New Guinea Highlands". Journal of Linguistic Anthropology 11 (2): 193–239.
- Rumsey, Alan (2007). "Musical, Poetic and Linguistic Form in 'Tom Yaya' Sung Narratives from Papua New Guinea". Anthropological Linguistics 49 (3/4): 237–282.
- Rumsey, Alan (2013). "Intersubjectivity, Deception and the 'Opacity of Other Minds': Perspectives from Highland New Guinea and Beyond". Language & Communication 33 (3): 326–343.

== Personal life ==
Since 2006 he has played bass guitar in the Canberra Contra Club Band.
