= George Lukins =

English tailor

- Born: 1743/1744
- Known for: Demonic possession and exorcism

George Lukins, also known as the Yatton daemoniac, was a tailor infamous for his alleged demonic possession and the subsequent exorcism that occurred in 1788 when he was aged 44; his case occasioned great controversy in England.

== Biography ==
The Rev. Joseph Easterbrook, the Anglican vicar of Temple Church, was summoned on Saturday, 31 May 1788, by Mrs. Sarah Barber, a woman who was travelling in the village of Yatton, Mendip, in the county of Somerset. The woman told the pastor that she came across a man by the name of George Lukins, a tailor and common carrier by profession, who had a strange malady "in which he sang and screamed in various sounds, some of which did not resemble a human voice; and declared, doctors could do him no service." Mrs. Barber, who formerly resided in Yatton, attested to the clergyman that Lukins had an extraordinary good character and attended services of worship, where he received the Church sacraments. However, for the past eighteen years, he had been subject to atypical fits, which Lukins believed resulted from a supernatural slap which knocked him down while he was acting in a Christmas pageant. Lukins was consequently taken under the care of Dr. Smith, an eminent surgeon of Wrington, among many other physicians, who in vain, tried to help George Lukins; moreover, after his twenty-week stay at St George's Hospital, the medical community there pronounced him incurable. Members of the community began to think that Lukins was bewitched and he himself declared that he was possessed by seven demons, who could only be driven out by seven clergymen. Rev. Joseph Easterbook contacted Methodist ministers in connexion with Rev. John Wesley who agreed to pray for George Lukins:

Some time ago I had a letter requesting me to make one of the seven ministers to pray over George Lukins. I cried out before God, "Lord, I am not fit for such a work; I have not faith to encounter a demoniac." It was powerfully applied, "God in this thy might." The day before we were to meet, I went to see Lukins, and found such faith, that I could then encounter the seven devils which he said tormented him. I did not doubt but deliverance would come. Suffice to say, when we met, the Lord heard prayer, and delivered the poor man.

— Rev. John Valton

An appeal for help was published in the Bristol Gazette, describing how Lukins, during his alleged possession, claimed that he was the devil, made barking noises, sung an inverted Te Deum, and was very violent. In response to this appeal, on Friday, 13 June 1778, seven clergymen, including Rev. Joseph Easterbrook, accompanied George Lukins to the vestry at Temple Church, where they performed an exorcism on the man, which included hymn singing and prayer. The deliverance concluded when the demons were allegedly cast out using the Trinitarian formula; the clergymen commanded the demons to return to hell and George Lukins then exclaimed "Blessed Jesus!", praised God, recited the Lord's Prayer, and then thanked the Methodist and Anglican clergymen. Rev. Easterbrook, when recording the events under the patronage of Rev. John Wesley, stated that the account would be doubted in this modern era of skepticism, but pointed to "the scriptures, and other authentic history, of ancient as well as modern times" to buttress what he felt was a valid case of demonic possession. In the following weeks the Bristol Gazette published a ding-dong correspondence between several pseudonymous writers, who accused each other variously of deception and bad faith in their opposing views of the exorcism, and, in the case of the writer who had provided the paper with the original appeal (believed to be William Robert Wake, Vicar of Backwell in Somerset), of downright Papistry. A selection of this correspondence was later published by one of the participants, Samuel Norman, a surgeon of Yatton who had been familiar with Lukins's case since 1770. In his conclusion, Norman provided evidence from Lukins's stay at St George's Hospital in the summer of 1775, which showed the patient had been considered by one attending doctor to be an impostor, and had been discharged as incurable solely on the grounds of his lameness, which symptom Norman also considered an imposture. Norman concluded:

In few years it is hoped, it will be a matter of astonishment, that there was a person to be found, silly enough to be duped by so ridiculous an impostor as George Lukins, in the year, 1788.

An article in The Gentleman's Magazine, and Historical Chronicle also criticized the account, stating that Lukins actually suffered from "epilepsy and St. Vitus's dance." Dr. Feriar, a medical demonologist, criticized George Lukins as an impostor masquerading as a demoniac. Nevertheless, after the exorcism, George Lukins was described as calm and happy. Following this case, several pieces of literature were printed on George Lukins, thus popularising his alleged case of diabolical possession and deliverance, despite the original design to keep the case a secret.

== See also ==
- Clara Germana Cele
- Anneliese Michel
- Robbie Mannheim
- Michael Taylor (Ossett)
- Johann Blumhardt
