= Benești =

Beneşti may refer to several villages in Romania:

- Beneşti, a village in Beliu Commune, Arad County
- Beneşti, a village in Stănișești Commune, Bacău County
- Beneşti, a village in Drăgoteşti Commune, Dolj County
- Beneşti, a village in Alțâna Commune, Sibiu County
- Beneşti, a village in Tanacu Commune, Vaslui County
- Beneşti, a village in the town of Bălceşti, Vâlcea County
