= Muntenii =

Muntenii may refer to one of two communes in Vaslui County, Romania:

- Muntenii de Jos
- Muntenii de Sus
