= Anthropological Theory =

- Discipline: Anthropology
- Language: English
- Edited by: Julia Eckert, Nina Glick Schiller, Stephen Reyna

Publication details
- History: 2001-present
- Publisher: SAGE Publications (United Kingdom)
- Frequency: Quarterly
- Impact factor: 1.509 (2018)

Standard abbreviations
- ISO 4: Anthropol. Theory

Indexing
- ISSN: 1463-4996 (print); 1741-2641 (web)
- LCCN: 2001229436
- OCLC no.: 230746257

Links
- Journal homepage; Online access; Online archive

Anthropological Theory is a quarterly peer-reviewed academic journal that publishes papers in the field of Anthropology. The journal's editors are Julia Eckert (University of Bern), Nina Glick Schiller (University of Manchester, Max Planck Institute for Social Anthropology) and Stephen Reyna (Max Planck Institute for Social Anthropology). It was previously edited by Joel Robbins and Jonathan Friedman. It has been in publication since 2001 and is currently published by SAGE Publications.

== Abstracting and indexing ==
Anthropological Theory is abstracted and indexed in, among other databases: SCOPUS, and the Social Sciences Citation Index. According to the Journal Citation Reports, its 2018 impact factor is 1.509, ranking it 28 out of 90 journals in the category ‘Anthropology’.
