= Jonathan Friedman =

American anthropologist

- Jonathan Ames Friedman
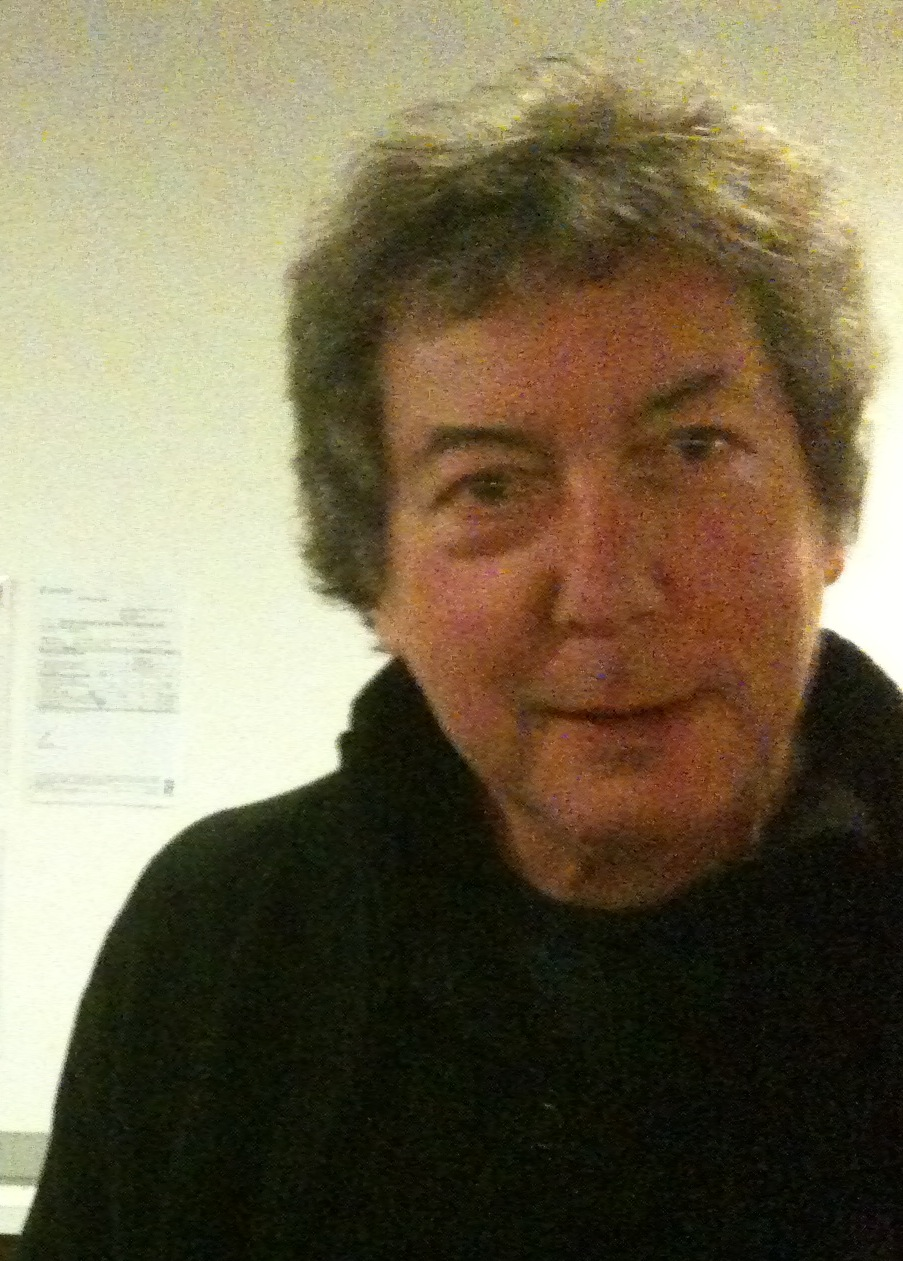
- Born: April 7, 1946
- Occupation: scholar

Academic background
- Education: Columbia University (Ph.D., 1972)
- Thesis: System, Structure, and Contradiction: The Evolution of 'Asiatic' Social Formations (1972)

Academic work
- Discipline: Anthropologist
- Sub-discipline: Cultural Anthropologist, Hawaii and Congo Specialist, Marxist Anthropology
- Institutions: University of California, San Diego; School for Advanced Studies in the Social Sciences

Jonathan Friedman (born April 7, 1946) is an American anthropologist. He earned his Ph.D. at Columbia University in 1972. He is professor emeritus of Anthropology at University of California, San Diego and Director of Studies at the École des hautes études en sciences sociales. He is an editorial board member of the journal Anthropological Theory. Friedman has done most of his research in Hawaii and the Republic of Congo.

== Current research ==
- Dynamics of tribal societies,
- Cultural identity and global processes,
- Global systemic anthropology,
- Transformation of the nation state,
- Multiculturalism and migration,
- Upland Southeast Asia,
- Oceania.

== Publications ==
- System, structure and contradiction in the evolution of "Asiatic" social formations, National Museum of Copenhagen, 1979 [+ 2nd edition: Altamira Press 1998, with a new foreword] with Scott Lash(eds) Modernity and identity, Blackwell, Oxford, 1992
- Consumption and Identity. London: Harwood Academic Press, 1994
- James, Paul (2006). Globalization and Violence, Vol. 3: Globalizing War and Intervention. London: Sage Publications.
- The anthropology of global systems: Modernities, class and the contradictions of globalization. Walnut Creek: Altamira Press 2007
