= Temple Church, Bristol =

Ruined church in Bristol, England

Temple Church
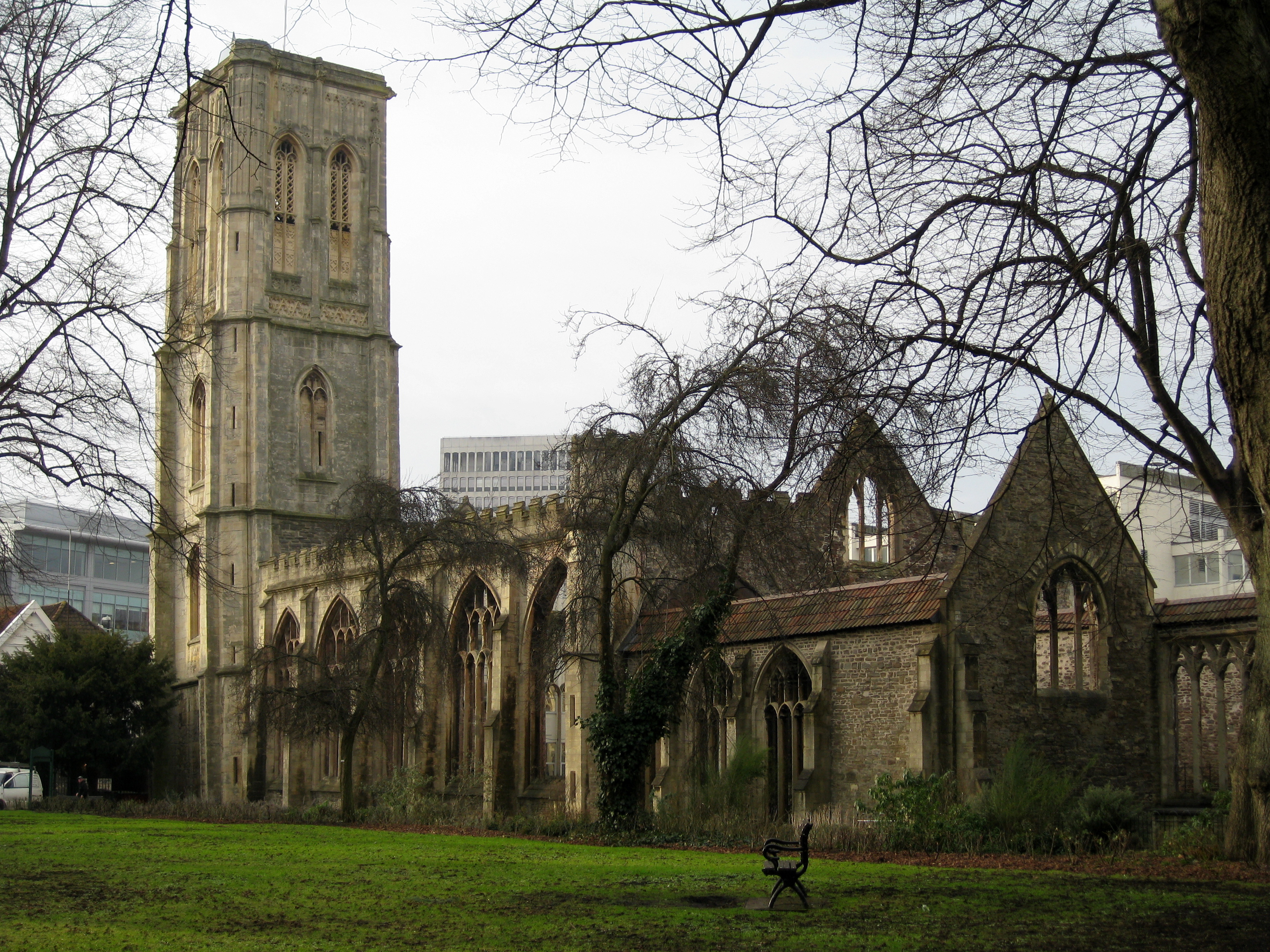
- Temple Church, Bristol

- Location within Bristol

General information
- Location: Bristol, England
- Coordinates: 51.452°N 2.587°W
- Construction started: 12th century

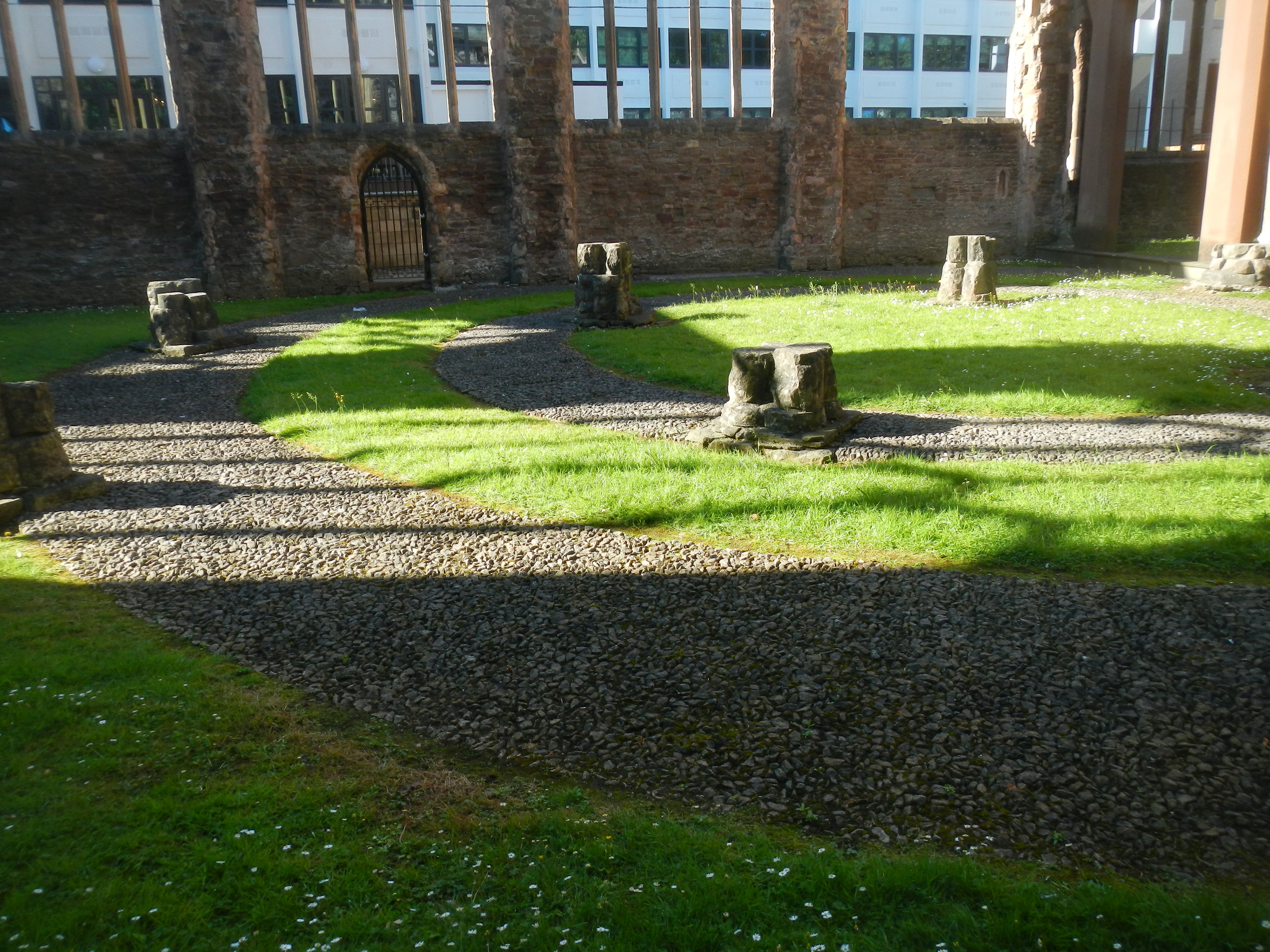
Outline of Templar circular church within Temple Church ruins

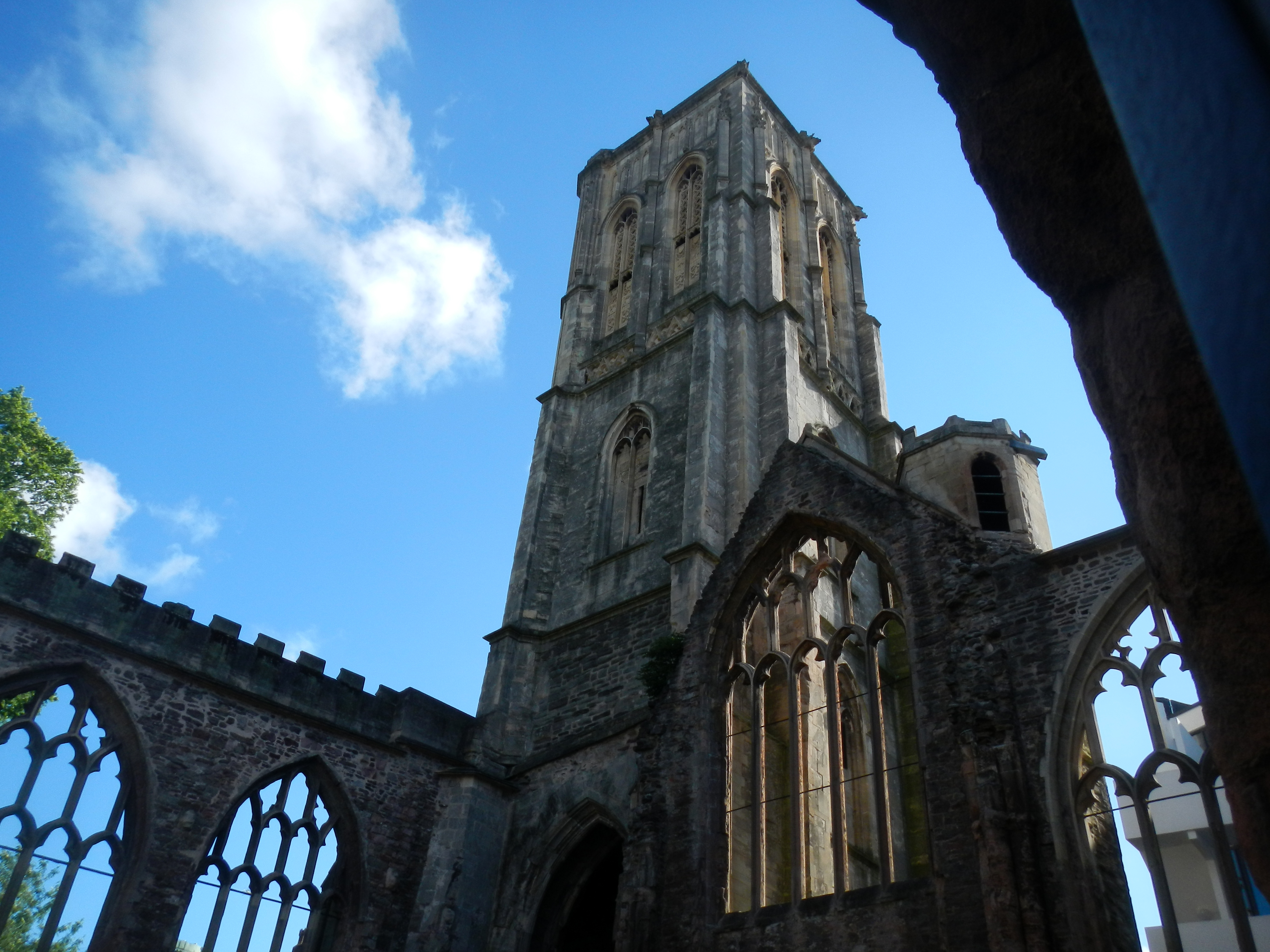
Interior view of Temple Church

Temple Church, also known as Holy Cross Church, (grid reference ST5972) is a ruined church in Redcliffe, Bristol, England. It is on the site of a previous, round church of the Knights Templar, which they built on land granted to them in the second quarter of the 12th century by Robert of Gloucester. In 1313 the Knights Hospitaller acquired the church, following the suppression of the Templars. By the early 14th century, the church served as the parish church for the area known as Temple Fee. From around the same time, the rebuilding of the church on a rectangular plan started. This was completed by 1460, with the construction of a leaning west tower. The Hospitallers would lose ownership of the church in 1540 during the dissolution of the monasteries.

The church was the scene of the exorcism of George Lukins conducted by Methodist and Anglican clergy in 1788.

The church was bombed and largely destroyed in the Bristol Blitz. It is a Grade II* listed building, owned by the Diocese of Bristol. In 1958, English Heritage agreed to undertake a guardianship role. A 1960 excavation by the Ministry of Works discovered the plan of the 12th-century church, enabling it to be marked out on the ground in stone.

== Early history ==
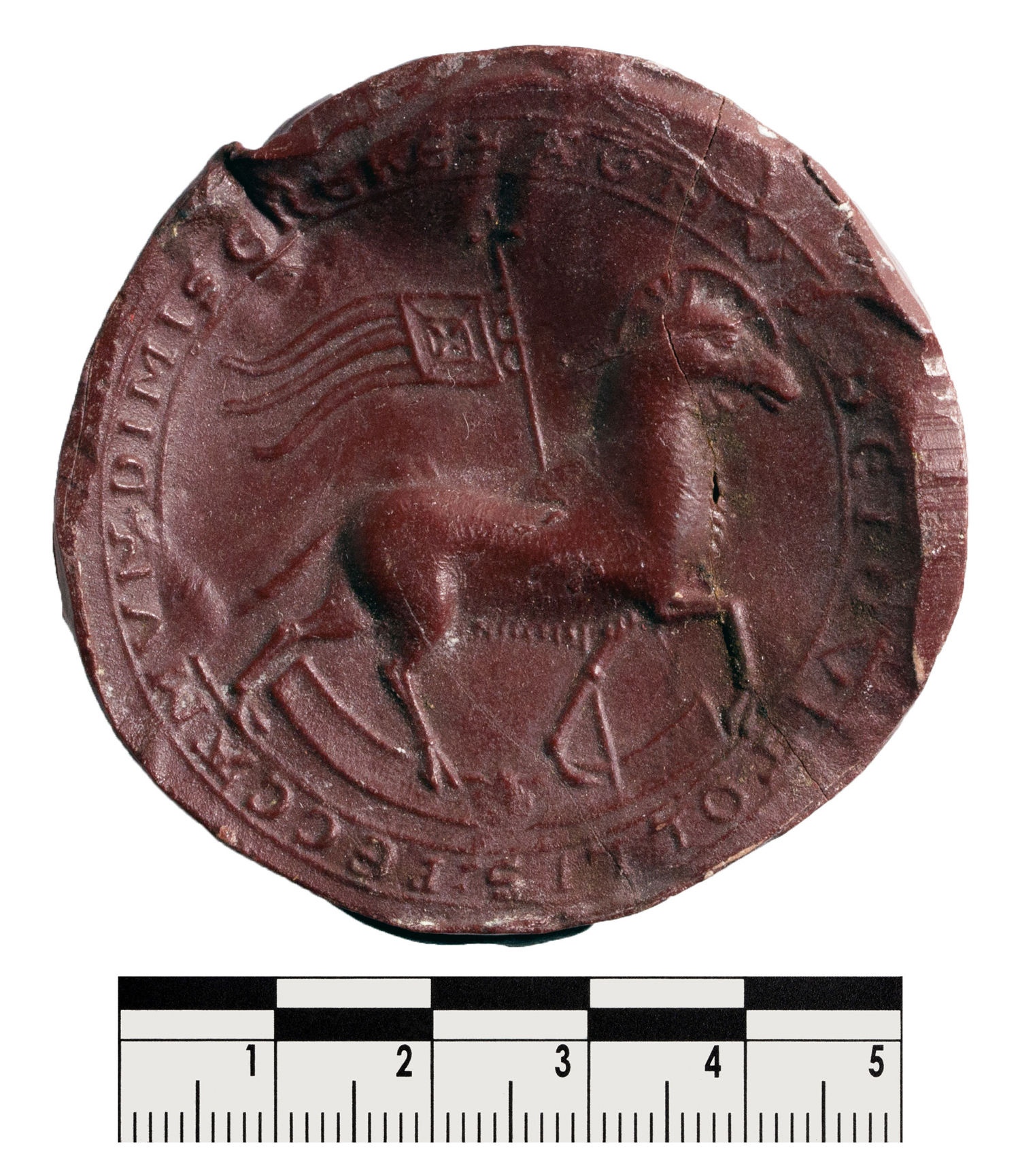
Circular wax cast of a Bristol Templar seal produced between 1850 and 1915 taken from a 13th-century seal matrix

The 12th-century church was a Templar preceptory, built on land granted to the Templars by Robert, 1st Earl of Gloucester, sometime in the two decades before his death in 1147. The estate, situated on soft, marshy ground between the river and what is now Victoria Street, was logistically significant for the Order. Historical research indicates the preceptory possessed its own dock or inlet at the end of Water Lane, and records from La Rochelle identify Templar ships named La Templere and Le Buscard as being registered to Bristol.

The Templars exercised specific legal privileges within their estate, known as Temple Fee. They claimed immunity from local authority, answering only to the Pope, which frequently caused friction with the town burgesses. This autonomy was highlighted by a legal dispute in 1242 involving a Deodand; following a fatal accident where a boy was killed by a falling pillory in Temple Street, the Order refused to pay the customary fine to local justices, eventually settling the matter with an ex gratia payment to the Sheriff. The Templars also imposed strict tenancy agreements, including an 'Obit' or death duty, which required tenants to bequeath one-third of their estate to the Order upon their death.

The parish of Temple Fee had come into being by 1308, the first year in which the church was recorded as having a vicar. Temple Fee and Redcliffe Fee were distinct parishes, physically separated by a "Law Ditch". Both were absorbed into Bristol by the city charter of 1373, ending a dispute between Bristol and Somerset over jurisdiction.

The Knights Hospitaller acquired the church in 1313, following the suppression of the Templars. However, the transfer of the estate was not immediate. Following the arrest of the Templars in 1307, the Bristol preceptory was subject to plunder. King Edward II seized substantial assets, including wool and grain, to service debts incurred during his Scottish military campaigns, while local residents looted the unguarded estate of livestock and provisions. By the time the Hospitallers took full possession, possibly as late as the 1330s, the estate had been significantly depleted. The Hospitallers lost their English properties to the Crown in 1540, and in 1544 the church was acquired by the Bristol Corporation.

Temple parish merged into St Mary Redcliffe parish in 1956.

== World War II bombing ==
The sole surviving church monument is that of Will Crabb (d. 1702), located in the under-tower space.

The church was bombed on 24/25 November 1940 in the Bristol Blitz, leaving it an empty shell. The damage was severe and although the arcades still stood they were very unsafe and have since been removed. The wrought-iron parclose screens to the side chapels did survive and are today in the Lord Mayor's Chapel. The sword rest by William Edney is now preserved but broken up into sections and re-erected in other churches. The 15th century candelabrum, with its central statue of the Virgin Mary also survived, albeit a little dented, and now hangs in the Berkeley Chapel of Bristol Cathedral. Temple Church also contained a peal of 8 bells, which were moved to the cathedral's north-west tower after the bombing.

The bombing destroyed the stores of records kept in the cellars.

== Listed status ==
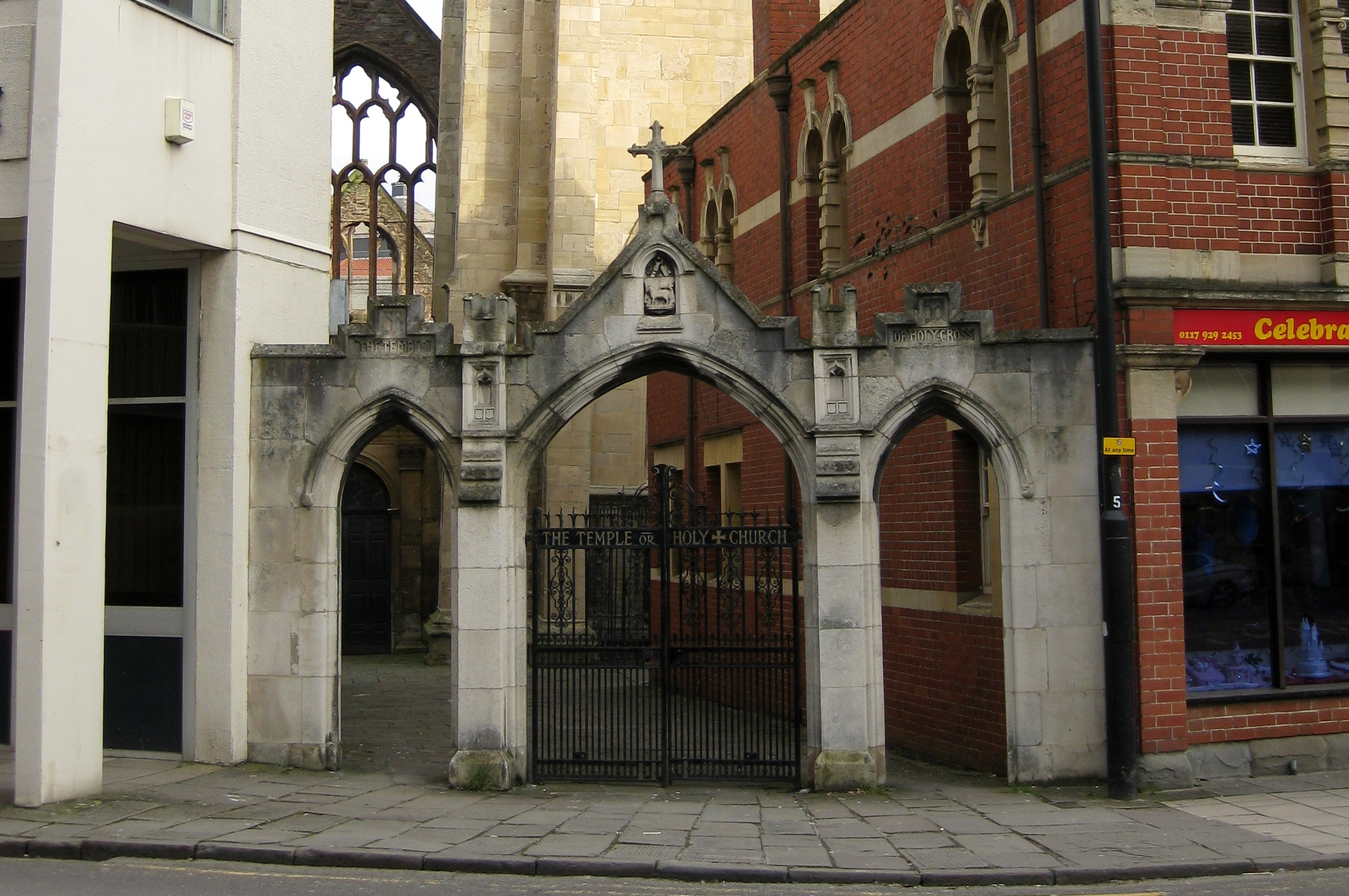
Gateway

It was the first English parish church to be taken into ownership by the then Ministry of Works, and is today in the care of English Heritage. It is protected by two heritage listings, as a Grade II* listed building, and as a scheduled monument.

The archway and gates, which date from the mid 19th century and made from Portland stone and wrought iron in a Gothic Revival style, are listed separately from the church as Grade II.

From 2021 to 2023 the site received significant restoration work by English Heritage in a conservation project costing about £1 million. This allowed the first public access for more than thirty years.

== Architecture ==
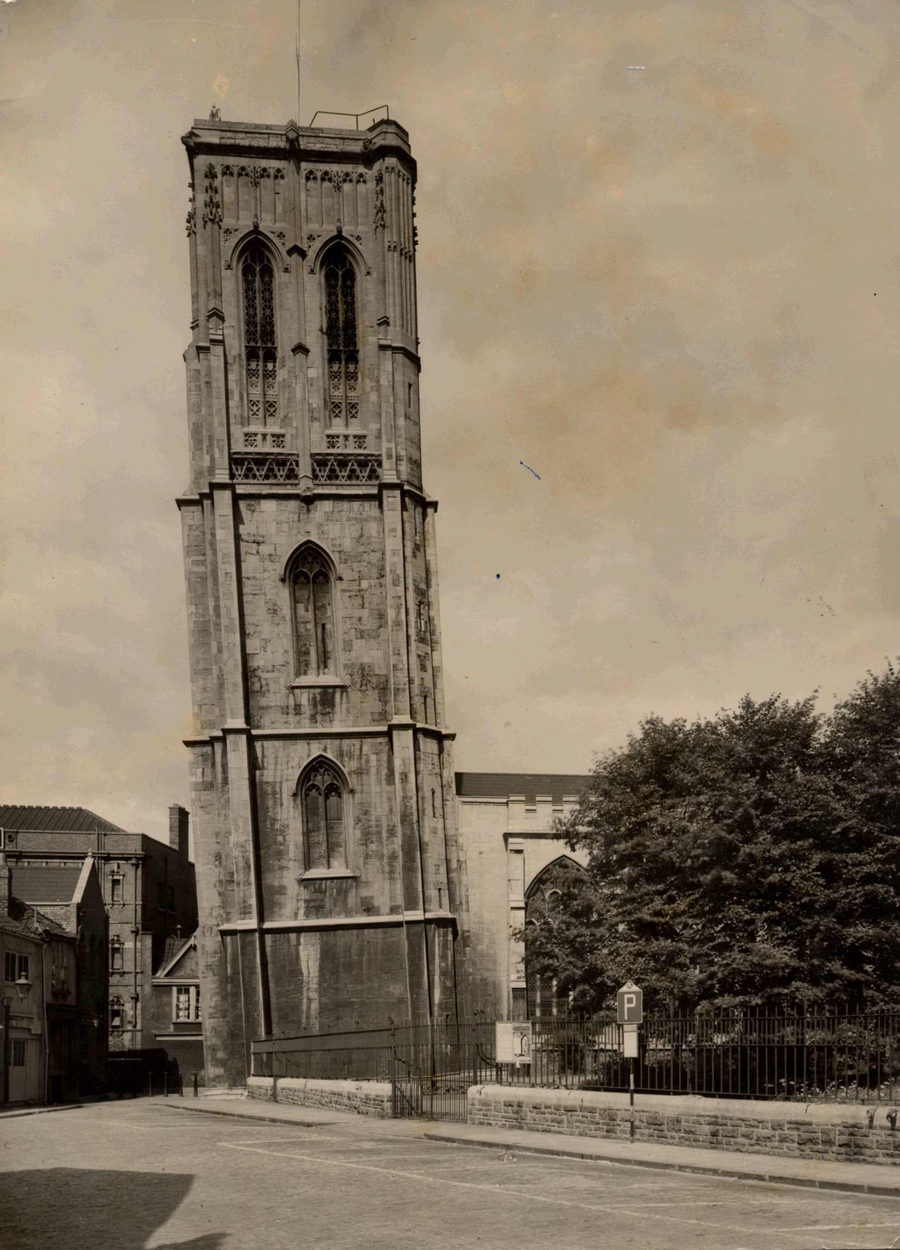
Pre-World War II view of the leaning tower, from the South

The 12th-century church had a round nave, with an aisle arcade, and a chancel with a semicircular apse. This chancel was replaced with a rectangular one, with a chapel added to its north side in Decorated style, in the late 13th or early 14th century. A second chapel was built later in the 14th century, on the south side, to which Perpendicular windows were added in the 15th century. These chapels have been identified respectively as St Katherine's Chapel, granted to the Bristol company of weavers by Edward I in 1299, and a chantry licensed to John Frauceys the younger by Edward III in 1331. Cloth weaving was the staple industry of Bristol in the late Middle Ages, and its centre was in Temple parish.

The round nave was replaced with a rectangular, aisled nave, in early Perpendicular style, completed around the last decade of the 14th century. The nave arcade was extended into the choir of the chancel.

A free-standing bell tower seems to have existed until the early 15th century, further to the west. The present, leaning west tower was built in stages, and completed between 1441 and 1460. The highest stage is at a different angle to the vertical to the lower stages, as the masons attempted to correct for the subsidence of the lower stages. The top of the tower leans 1.64 metres (5 ft 5 in) from the vertical. It is 114 feet (35 m) high. The lean is popularly attributed to the foundations of the tower being built on top of wool-sacks but is most likely due to the soft alluvial clay underneath being compressed.

== Archives ==
Parish records for Temple Church, Bristol are held at Bristol Archives (Ref. P.Tem) (online catalogue) including baptism, marriage, burial and burial in woollen registers. The archive also includes records of the churchwardens, charities and vestry. The archive of records for Temple Church is fragmented because the records were kept within the church when it was bombed.

== Performance events ==
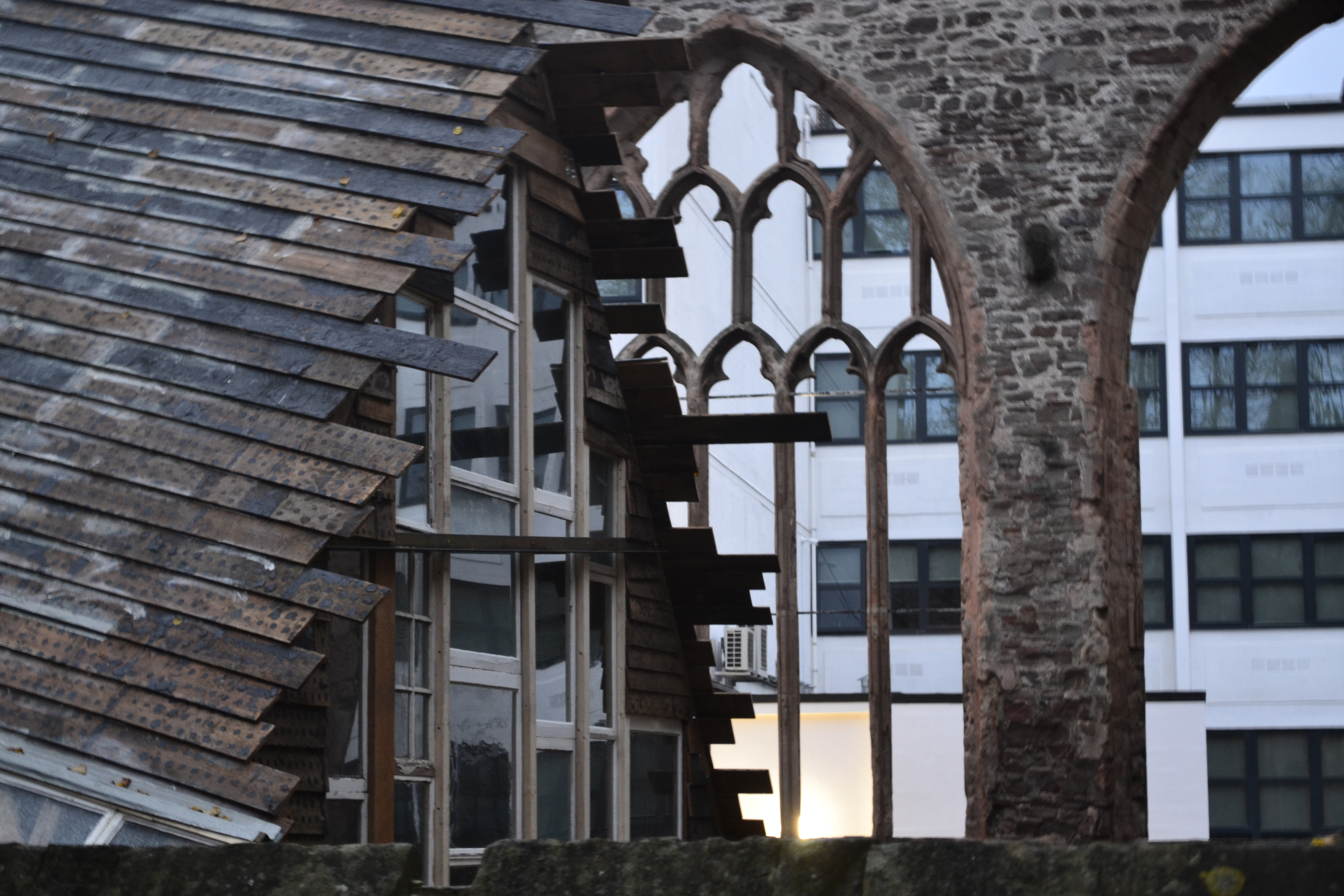
The temporary sound performance space devised by Theaster Gates

From 29 October to 21 November 2015, the church hosted Sanctum, a performance event created by the American installation artist Theaster Gates together with the art group Situations, as part of Bristol 2015 European Green Capital. A temporary, steepled auditorium was built inside the church, using salvaged historic materials from elsewhere in Bristol, designed to amplify the sounds of musical and other performances taking place 24 hours a day for 24 days.

The site participated in the 2023 Bristol Light Festival, celebrating its opening on 3 February following a restoration project.

== See also ==
- Grade II* listed buildings in Bristol
- List of churches in Bristol
