= Tanacu =

- Commune
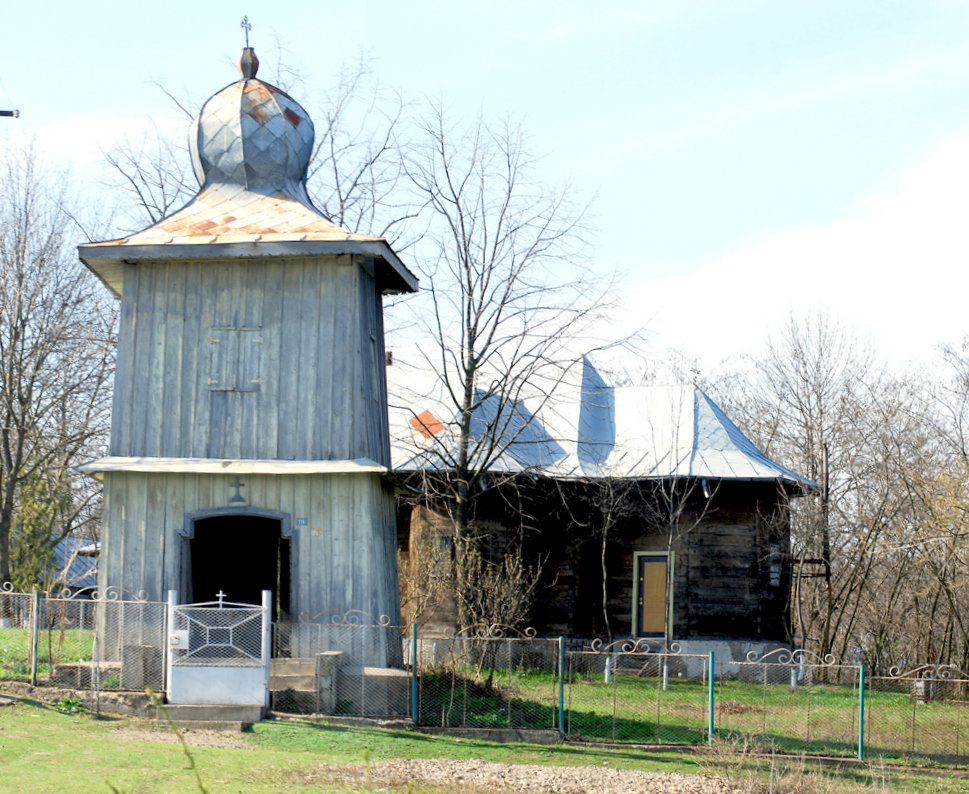
- Holy Voivodes Church in Tanacu

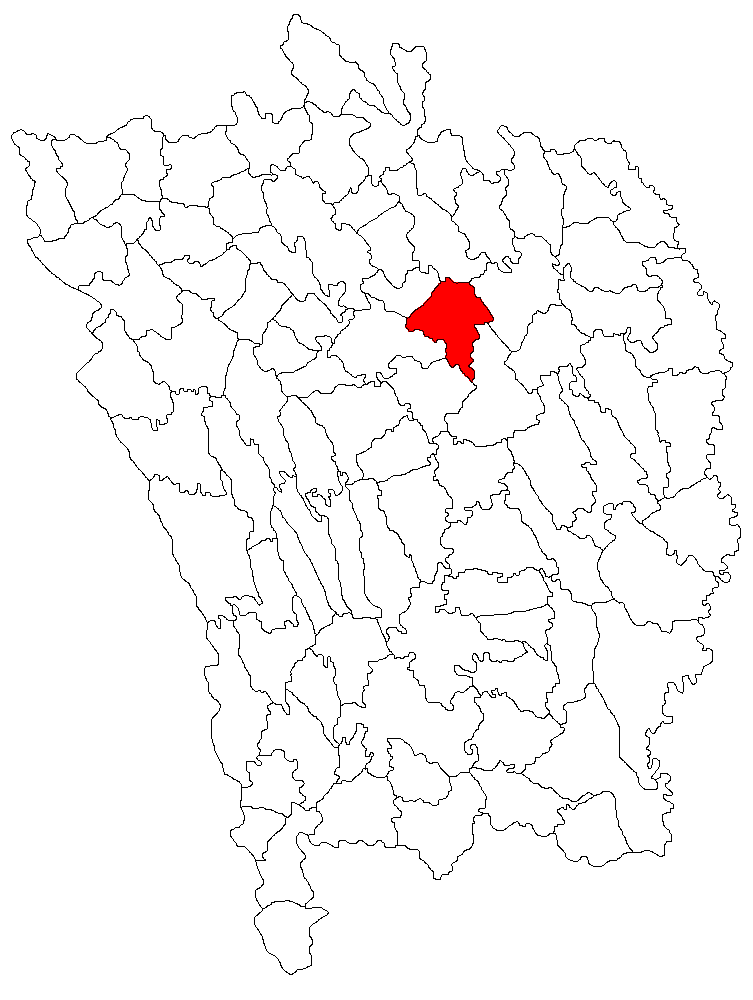
- Location in Vaslui County

- Location in Romania
- Coordinates: 46°41′N 27°49′E
- Country: Romania
- County: Vaslui

Government
  - Mayor (2024–2028): Dănuț Dumitriu (PSD)
- Area: 62.31 km^{2} (24.06 sq mi)
- Elevation: 196 m (643 ft)
- Population (2021-12-01): 1,724
  - Density: 27.67/km^{2} (71.66/sq mi)
- Time zone: UTC+02:00 (EET)
  - Summer (DST): UTC+03:00 (EEST)
- Postal code: 737510
- Area code: +(40) 235
- Vehicle reg.: VS
- Website: primariatanacu.ro

Tanacu is a commune in Vaslui County, Western Moldavia, Romania. It is composed of two villages, Benești and Tanacu. It included Muntenii de Sus and Satu Nou villages from 1968 to 2004, when these were split off to form Muntenii de Sus Commune.

The commune is the site of the Tanacu monastery, where the Tanacu exorcism occurred.
