= Clara Germana Cele =

South African woman possessed by demons

Clara Germana Cele (c. 1890–1912) was a South African Christian girl, who in 1906, was said to be possessed by a demon.

== Possession and death ==
She is said to have been possessed when she was a sixteen-year-old school girl at St. Michael's Mission in Natal, South Africa. The girl was an orphan of African origin and was baptised as an infant. At the age of sixteen, the girl allegedly made a pact with Satan and this is said to be the cause of her demonic possession. Clara later revealed this information to her confessor, Father Hörner Erasmus. In an account written by a nun, Clara was said to be able to speak languages of which she had no previous knowledge. This fact was also witnessed by others, who recorded that she "understood Polish, German, French, Norwegian and all other languages." The nun reported that Clara demonstrated clairvoyance by revealing the most intimate secrets and transgressions of people with whom she had no contact. Moreover, Clara could not bear the presence of blessed objects and seemed imbued with extraordinary strength and ferocity, often hurling nuns about the convent rooms and beating them up. The nun reported that the girl's cries had a savage bestiality that astonished those around her. In regards to the girl's voice, an attending nun even wrote:

No animal had ever made such sounds. Neither the lions of East Africa nor the angry bulls. At times, it sounded like a veritable herd of wild beasts orchestrated by Satan had formed a hellish choir. Attending nun of St. Michael's Mission, Natal, South Africa

The girl, according to some, was said to have levitated five feet in the air, sometimes vertically and sometimes horizontally; when sprinkled with holy water, the girl is reported to have come out of this state of her satanic possession.

According to a Lutheran Pastoral Handbook, one possessing these symptoms is an indication that an individual is truly possessed, rather than suffering from a mental illness. Consequently, two Roman Catholic priests, Rev. Mansueti (Director of the St. Michael's Mission) and Rev. Erasmus (her confessor), were appointed to perform an exorcism on Clara Germana Cele; this deliverance lasted for two days. During the exorcism, Clara's first action was to knock the Holy Bible from the priest's hands and grab his stole in an attempt to choke him with it. At the end of the exorcism, it was said that the demon was forced out and the girl was healed.

For six years, Clara lived a demonic possession-free life. She felt ashamed for her behavior, asking for forgiveness while seeking humble pursuits. She died in 1912 from heart failure, at age 22.

== See also ==
- Anneliese Michel
- Johann Blumhardt
- Robbie Mannheim
- Michael Taylor (Ossett)
- George Lukins
