= Muntenii de Sus =

- Commune
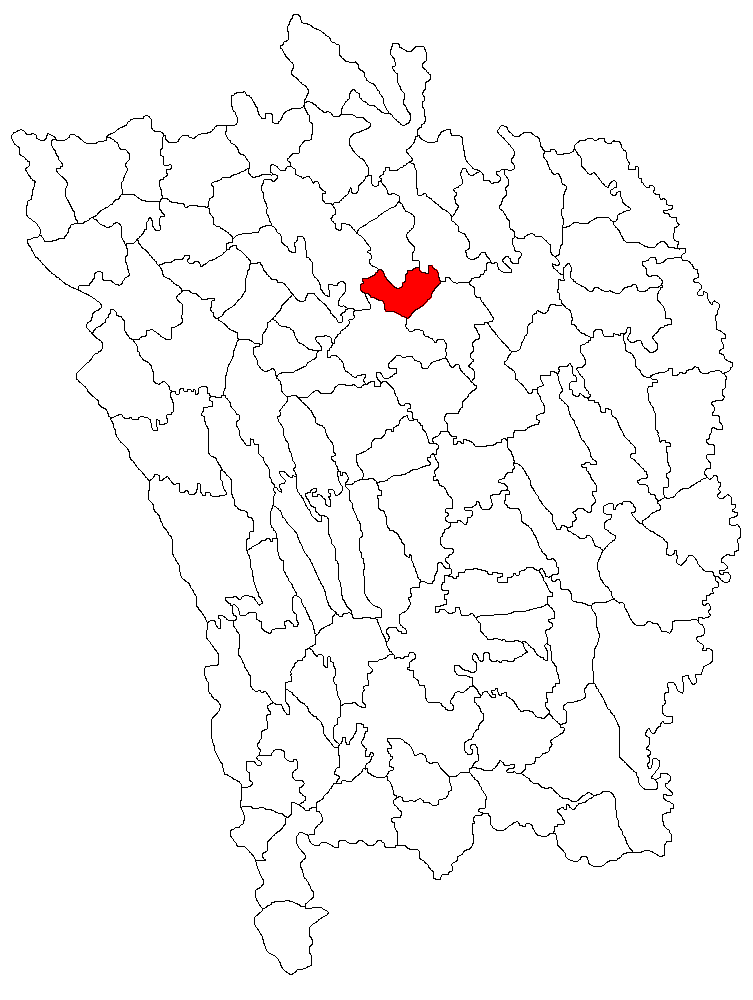
- Location in Vaslui County

- Location in Romania
- Coordinates: 46°42′N 27°46′E
- Country: Romania
- County: Vaslui
- Subdivisions: Muntenii de Sus, Satu Nou

Government
  - Mayor (2020–2024): Ion Vartolomei (PSD)
- Area: 22.00 km^{2} (8.49 sq mi)
- Population (2021-12-01): 2,866
  - Density: 130/km^{2} (340/sq mi)
- Time zone: EET/EEST (UTC+2/+3)
- Vehicle reg.: VS

Muntenii de Sus is a commune in Vaslui County, Western Moldavia, Romania. It is composed of two villages, Muntenii de Sus and Satu Nou. These were part of Tanacu Commune from 1968 until 2004, when they were split off.
