= Joel Robbins =

American Socio-Cultural anthropologist (born 1961)

Joel Robbins (born 1961) is an American socio-cultural anthropologist; he is at the University of Cambridge, where he is the Sigrid Rausing Professor of Social Anthropology and the deputy head of Division and REF coordinator for Division of Social Anthropology, as well as a fellow at Trinity College. He was previously employed at the University of California, San Diego (1998–2013), and at Reed College (1996–1998), and was awarded his Ph.D. from the University of Virginia in 1998. He has published works on the anthropology of Papua New Guinea, anthropological theory, the anthropology of Christianity, religious change, the anthropology of ethics and morals, and the anthropology of value. Ethnographically, he is known for his work with the Urapmin people. His book Becoming Sinners: Christianity and Moral Torment in a Papua New Guinea Society was awarded the J. I. Staley prize by the School for Advanced Research in 2011. He is currently the series editor for the University of California Press "Anthropology of Christianity" book series, and has also served as a co-editor for the journal Anthropological Theory.

== Major publications ==
- 2020 Theology and the Anthropology of Christian Life. Oxford University Press.
- 2015 "Ritual, Value, and Example: On the Perfection of Cultural Representations." Journal of the Royal Anthropological Institute 21 (S1): 18–29.
- 2014 Editor (with Naomi Haynes) of The Anthropology of Christianity: Unity, Diversity, New Directions. Special Issue of Current Anthropology 55 (Supplement 10).
- 2013 "Beyond the Suffering Subject: Toward an Anthropology of the Good." Journal of the Royal Anthropological Institute. 19: 447–462.
- 2011 "Crypto-Religion and the Study of Cultural Mixtures: Anthropology, Value, and the Nature of Syncretism." Journal of the American Academy of Religion 79(2): 408–424.
- 2007 "Between Reproduction and Freedom: Morality, Value, and Radical Cultural Change." Ethnos 72(3): 293–314.
- 2007 "Continuity Thinking and the Problem of Christian Culture: Belief, Time and the Anthropology of Christianity." Current Anthropology 48(1): 5-38.
- 2006 "Anthropology and Theology: An Awkward Relationship?" Anthropological Quarterly. 79(2): 285–294.
- 2004 Becoming Sinners: Christianity and Moral Torment in a Papua New Guinea Society. University of California Press.
- 2004 "The Globalization of Pentecostal and charismatic Christianity." Annual Review of Anthropology 33:117-143.
- 2003 "What is a Christian? Notes toward an anthropology of Christianity" Religion. 33(3):191-199.
- 2001 "God is Nothing But Talk: Modernity, Language and Prayer in a Papua New Guinea Society." American Anthropologist 103(4).
