= Michael Taylor (British killer) =

British murderer (born 1944)

- Born: September 21, 1944 (age 81); Ossett, West Yorkshire, England
- Occupation: Butcher
- Criminal charges: Murdering his wife
- Criminal penalty: acquitted due to insanity
- Spouse: Christine Taylor (died 1974)
- Children: 5

Michael Taylor (born 21 September 1944) became notable in England in 1974 as a result of the Ossett murder case and his alleged demonic possession.

== Exorcism ==
Taylor lived in Ossett, West Yorkshire, with his wife, Christine, and their five children, whilst working as a butcher. In 1974, Taylor's wife stated to a Christian Fellowship Group to which Taylor belonged, that his relationship with the lay leader of the group, Marie Robinson, was "carnal" in nature. Michael Taylor admitted that he felt evil within him and was encouraged by the group to work the issue out with Robinson. The two entered a bedroom alone where Taylor made a pass at Robinson and was rejected. Upon exiting the bedroom, Robinson related Taylor's behaviour to the group, which included his wife, and Taylor eventually attacked Robinson verbally, who screamed back at him. During the next meeting, Michael Taylor received an absolution, but nevertheless, his behaviour continued to become more erratic. Robinson approached Taylor and his wife with an offer to perform an exorcism but was rebuffed. As a result, the local vicar, Peter Vincent, known to be an expert in the art of deliverance called in other experienced ministers in preparation to cast out the demons residing within the man.

The exorcism, which occurred on the night of 5–6 October 1974 at St. Thomas's Church in Gawber, was headed by Vincent, the Anglican priest of St. Thomas's, and was aided by a Methodist clergyman, the Rev. Raymond Smith. According to Bill Ellis, an authority on folklore and the occult in contemporary culture, the exorcists believed that they had: "In an all-night ceremony...invoked and cast out at least forty demons, including those of incest, bestiality, blasphemy, and lewdness. At the end, exhausted, they allowed Taylor to go home, although they felt that at least three demons—insanity, murder, and violence—were still left in him."

== Murder ==
After returning home, Taylor brutally murdered his wife, Christine. He attacked her with his bare hands, ripped her eyes and tongue out and almost tearing her face off, then strangling their poodle. He was found by a policeman, naked in the street, covered with blood.

At his trial in March 1975, 30-years-old Taylor was acquitted on the grounds of insanity. He was sent to Broadmoor Hospital for two years, then spent another two years in a secure ward in Bradford before being released. The bizarre nature of the case attracted significant publicity.

== In popular culture ==
Taylor's case makes a prominent appearance in David Peace's novel Nineteen Seventy-Seven, the second of Peace's Red Riding Quartet. Taylor, renamed Michael Williams, is exorcised by Father Martin Laws, the series' main villain, and afterward kills his wife Carol by driving a nail into her skull. Jack Whitehead, one of the two protagonists, witnesses the exorcism of Williams and the murder of Carol Williams, his ex-wife, which as in real life takes place in Ossett.

Taylor's case is mentioned in the 2021 film The Conjuring: The Devil Made Me Do It, which is based on another case in which a killer claimed demonic possession, that of Arne Cheyenne Johnson, who killed his landlord with a pocket knife in a fit of rage in 1981.

Taylor's case is covered by various true crime podcasts and videos on social media platforms.

== See also ==
- Trial of Arne Cheyenne Johnson
- Anneliese Michel
- Clara Germana Cele
- David Berkowitz
- Exorcism of Roland Doe
- Johann Blumhardt
