= The Exorcist (franchise) =

Horror media franchise

- Official franchise logo
- Created by: William Peter Blatty
- Original work: The Exorcist (1971)
- Owners: Morgan Creek (franchise); Warner Bros. (1973–77, 2004–05); 20th Century Studios (1990 & TV series); Universal Pictures (2023–present)

Print publications
- Novels: The Exorcist; Legion (1983); Exorcist: The Beginning (2004)

Films and television
- Films: The Exorcist (1973); Exorcist II: The Heretic (1977); The Exorcist III (1990); Exorcist: The Beginning (2004); Dominion: Prequel to the Exorcist (2005); The Exorcist: Believer (2023); The Exorcist: Martyrs (2027)
- Television series: The Exorcist (2016–2017)

The Exorcist is an American horror media franchise that originated with William Peter Blatty's 1971 horror novel (itself inspired by the 1949 exorcism of Roland Doe) and most prominently featured in a 1973 film adaptation of the novel, spawned many subsequent prequels and sequels although none of them (excluding the television series) compared positively to the original. All of these installments focus on fictional accounts of people possessed by Pazuzu, the main antagonist of the series, and the efforts of religious authorities to counter this possession.

The films have grossed over $661 million at the worldwide box office and the novel has sold over 13 million copies. 20th Century Fox Television developed a 2016 television series as a continuation of the 1973 film, to generally positive reviews. In 2020, a reboot of the film series, which was later changed to a direct sequel to the 1973 film, was announced to be in development with David Gordon Green as director. Produced by Blumhouse Productions, the film, titled The Exorcist: Believer was released by Universal Pictures on October 6, 2023. The film did not meet box-office expectations and plans for a trilogy were scrapped in favor of The Exorcist: Martyrs with Mike Flanagan as director.

== Novels ==
=== The Exorcist (1971) ===
The Exorcist is a 1971 novel by American writer William Peter Blatty. It was adapted into the 1973 film of the same name. The book details the demonic possession of twelve-year-old Regan MacNeil, the daughter of a famous actress, and the two priests who attempt to exorcise the demon. It was published by Harper & Row.

The novel was inspired by a 1949 case of demonic possession and exorcism that Blatty heard about while he was a student in the class of 1950 at Georgetown University. As a result, the novel takes place in Washington D.C. near the campus of Georgetown University. In September 2011, the novel was reprinted by HarperCollins to celebrate its 40th anniversary, with slight revisions made by Blatty as well as interior title artwork by Jeremy Caniglia.

=== Legion (1983) ===
Legion is the 1983 follow-up to the Exorcist novel, also written by William Peter Blatty. It was made into the movie The Exorcist III in 1990. Like The Exorcist, it involves demonic possession. The book was the focus of a court case over its exclusion from The New York Times Best Seller list.

Blatty based aspects of the Gemini Killer on the real-life Zodiac Killer, who, in a January 1974 letter to the San Francisco Chronicle, had praised the original Exorcist film as "the best satirical comedy that I have ever seen".

=== Exorcist: The Beginning (2004) ===
Exorcist: The Beginning is a novelization of the 2004 film of the same name. Written by Steven Piziks, it was released by Pocket Star on October 4, 2004.

== Films ==
Film	U.S. release date	Director(s)	Screenwriter(s)	Story by	Producer(s)
The Exorcist	December 26, 1973	William Friedkin	William Peter Blatty	William Peter Blatty	William Peter Blatty
Exorcist II: The Heretic	June 17, 1977	John Boorman	William Goodhart	William Goodhart	John Boorman and Richard Lederer
The Exorcist III	August 17, 1990	William Peter Blatty	William Peter Blatty	William Peter Blatty	Carter DeHaven and James G. Robinson
Exorcist: The Beginning	August 20, 2004	Renny Harlin	Alexi Hawley	William Wisher and Caleb Carr	James G. Robinson
Dominion: Prequel to the Exorcist	May 20, 2005	Paul Schrader	William Wisher Jr. and Caleb Carr	William Wisher Jr. and Caleb Carr	James G. Robinson
The Exorcist: Believer	October 6, 2023	David Gordon Green	Peter Sattler and David Gordon Green	Scott Teems, Danny McBride and David Gordon Green	Jason Blum, James G. Robinson and David Robinson
The Exorcist: Martyrs	March 12, 2027	Mike Flanagan	Mike Flanagan	Mike Flanagan	Mike Flanagan, Jason Blum and David Robinson

=== The Exorcist (1973) ===
The Exorcist is a 1973 American supernatural horror film directed by William Friedkin, adapted by William Peter Blatty from his 1971 novel of the same name, and starring Ellen Burstyn, Linda Blair, Max von Sydow, and Jason Miller.

The book, inspired by the 1949 exorcism of Roland Doe, deals with the demonic possession of a 12-year-old girl and her mother's attempts to win back her child through an exorcism conducted by two priests. The adaptation is faithful to the book, which itself has been commercially successful (appearing on the New York Times bestseller list).

=== Exorcist II: The Heretic (1977) ===
John Boorman's Exorcist II: The Heretic was released in 1977 and serves as a sequel to the predecessor. The plot, which takes place four years after the first film, centers on Father Philip Lamont (Richard Burton), who is struggling with his faith, as he is assigned by Cardinal (Paul Henreid) to investigate the death of Father Lankester Merrin (Max von Sydow). Merrin was killed during The Exorcist as he performed the titular exorcism of Regan MacNeil (Linda Blair). Flashback sequences show Regan give Merrin his fatal heart attack as well as scenes from the exorcism of a young boy named Kokumo in Africa many years earlier. The Cardinal informs Lamont (who has had some experience at exorcism, and has been exposed to Merrin's teachings) that Merrin is being investigated posthumously for heresy. Despite approval for the MacNeil exorcism by a bishop, the Church is no longer convinced that MacNeil was truly possessed, and the controversial nature of Merrin's books on the subject are being reconsidered as politically and theologically suspect.

=== The Exorcist III (1990) ===
Adapted and directed by Blatty from his 1983 novel Legion, the film stars George C. Scott and several cast members (Jason Miller (reprising his Academy Award-nominated role from The Exorcist), Ed Flanders, Scott Wilson and George DiCenzo) from Blatty's previous film The Ninth Configuration. The story takes place 15 years after the events of The Exorcist and turns a supporting character from the first film (philosophical police detective William F. Kinderman (Scott) into the main protagonist. He investigates a series of brutal murders in Georgetown that resemble the modus operandi of a serial killer executed about the time of the MacNeil exorcism.

Originally titled Legion, the film was drastically changed after rewrites and re-shoots ordered by the studio Morgan Creek Productions. Studio executives demanded the addition of an exorcism sequence and retitled the film as The Exorcist III in order to more strongly tie the film to the rest of the franchise. All of the deleted footage was previously said to be lost/destroyed but has since been found and released in 2016 under the name "The Exorcist III: Legion".

Despite his misgivings about the studio-imposed reshoots, Blatty is proud of the finished version of The Exorcist III, having said: "It's still a superior film. And in my opinion, and excuse me if I utter heresy here, but for me, it's a more frightening film than The Exorcist". Nevertheless, Blatty had hoped to recover the deleted footage from the Morgan Creek vaults so that he might re-assemble the original cut of the film which he said was "rather different" from what was released, and a version of the film fans of the Exorcist series had been requesting. In 2007, Blatty's wife reported on a fan site that "my husband tells me that it is Morgan Creek's claim that they have lost all the footage, including an alternate opening scene in which Kinderman views the body of Karras in the morgue, right after his fall down the steps". According to Mark Kermode quoting an article dating to 2009, the search for the missing footage was "ongoing". The Exorcist III: Legion has since been released in 2016.

=== Exorcist: The Beginning (2004) ===
Because of the studio's dissatisfaction with Schrader's version of the prequel (see below section Dominion: Prequel to the Exorcist), Renny Harlin was hired as director to retool the movie. Harlin reused some of Schrader's footage but shot mostly new material to create a more conventional horror film. Harlin's new version, Exorcist: The Beginning, was released, but it was not well received.

The plot revolves around the crisis of faith suffered by Father Merrin (Stellan Skarsgård) following the horrific events he witnessed during World War II. After WWII, Merrin is an archaeologist in Cairo, when he is approached by a collector of antiquities who asks him to come to a British excavation in the Turkana region of Kenya. This dig is excavating a Christian Byzantine church from the 5th century—long before Christianity had reached that region. Further, the church is in perfect condition, as though it had been buried immediately after the construction was completed. Merrin is asked to participate in the dig and find an ancient relic hidden in the ruins before the British do. Merrin takes the job but soon discovers that all is not well—something evil lies in the church and is infecting the region. The local tribesman hired to dig refuse to enter the building, and there are stories of an epidemic that wiped out an entire village. However, when Merrin, growing suspicious of these rumors, digs up one of the graves of the supposed victims of this plague, he discovers it is empty. Meanwhile, the evil grows, turning people against each other and resulting in violence, atrocities, and more bloodshed.

=== Dominion: Prequel to the Exorcist (2005) ===
A prequel film attracted attention and controversy before its release in 2004; it went through a number of directorial and script changes, such that two versions were ultimately released. John Frankenheimer was originally hired as director for the project, but he withdrew before filming started due to health concerns. He died a month later. Paul Schrader then replaced him. Upon completion, the studio rejected Schrader's version as being too slow and hired another director to retool the movie. Nine months after the release of the retooled movie (see above section Exorcist: The Beginning), Schrader's original version, retitled Dominion: Prequel to the Exorcist, was given a small theatrical release.

Several years before the events in The Exorcist, the young Father Lankester Merrin (played by Skarsgård, who played the same part in the Exorcist: The Beginning) travels to East Africa. Merrin has taken a sabbatical from the Church and devoted himself to history and archaeology as he struggles with his shattered faith. He is haunted especially by an incident in a small village in occupied Holland during World War II, where he served as the parish priest. Near the end of the war, a sadistic Nazi SS commander, in retaliation for the murder of a German trooper, forces Merrin to participate in arbitrary executions in order to save a full village from slaughter. He meets up with a team of archaeologists, who are seeking to unearth a church that they believe has been buried for centuries. At first, Merrin resists the idea that supernatural forces are in play but eventually helps them, and the ensuing events result in an encounter with Pazuzu, the same demon referenced in The Exorcist.

=== The Exorcist: Believer (2023) ===
In August 2020, it was revealed that Morgan Creek Entertainment was developing a theatrical reboot of The Exorcist. In December, Blumhouse Productions and Morgan Creek changed the reboot to a "direct" sequel which would be directed by Halloween's director David Gordon Green. Jason Blum, David Robinson and James Robinson would produce. Though the film serves as a direct follow-up to the original, Green confirmed that each of the franchise installments are still canon to his new film.

In July 2021, it was revealed that a trilogy of sequels were in development with David Gordon Green attached as director on each film. Green and Peter Sattler would write the screenplays, from a story by Green, Scott Teems, and Danny McBride. Jason Blum would serve as producer, alongside James Robinson and David Robinson. Burstyn would reprise her role from the original film, with Leslie Odom Jr. co-starring. The projects would be joint-venture productions between Blumhouse Productions and Morgan Creek Entertainment, with Universal Pictures serving as distributing company. Universal collaborated with Peacock to purchase distribution rights for $400 million total. The second and third films of the trilogy were being optioned as Peacock exclusive films. Later that month, Linda Blair stated that she had not yet been contacted to reprise her role from the original film.

In June 2022, Burstyn stated that she had completed production for her part in the film, revealing that principal photography had commenced some time previous. Linda Blair makes a cameo appearance as her iconic character, Regan MacNeil. The film was theatrically released on October 6, 2023. The film's terrible reception lead the studio to cancel the remainder of Green's planned trilogy.

=== The Exorcist: Martyrs (2027) ===
By May 2024, Mike Flanagan was in talks to work on the next Exorcist film. Later that month, Flanagan was confirmed to be directing, writing and producing a new Exorcist film as a reboot. The reboot was slated for release on March 13, 2026, but Flanagan revealed in a Tumblr post that the film was not going to begin production until after he finished work on the television series adaptation of Carrie and that there was "no way it's coming out next March." In November 2025, it was announced that Scarlett Johansson joined the cast. The film is scheduled to be released on March 12, 2027.

== Television ==
=== The Exorcist (2016–2017) ===
In 2016, 20th Century Fox Television developed a television series of The Exorcist, designed as a continuation of the film. The premise was described as "a propulsive, serialized psychological thriller following two very different men tackling one family's case of horrifying demonic possession, and confronting the face of true evil". Rupert Wyatt directed the pilot episode whilst Alfonso Herrera and Ben Daniels were cast as Father Tomas Ortega and Father Marcus Keane. Geena Davis was cast as Angela Rance in the pilot. The pilot was filmed in Chicago in early 2016. The series ran for two seasons, and was canceled by Fox in May 2018.

== Cast and characters ==
List indicators

This section includes characters who will appear or have appeared in more than two films in the series.

- An empty grey cell indicates the character was not in the film, or that the character's official presence has not yet been confirmed.
- ^{A} indicates an appearance through archival footage or audio.
- ^{C} indicates a cameo role.
- ^{G} indicates a guest appearance in the season.
- ^{M} indicates an appearance in onscreen movie footage.
- ^{O} indicates an older version of the character.
- ^{P} indicates an appearance in onscreen photographs.
- ^{R} indicates a recurring role in the season.
- ^{U} indicates an uncredited appearance.
- ^{V} indicates a voice-only role.
- ^{Y} indicates a younger version of the character.

Characters	Films							Television series	
Characters	The Exorcist	Exorcist II The Heretic	The Exorcist III	Exorcist The Beginning	Dominion Prequel to the Exorcist	The Exorcist Believer	The Exorcist Martyrs	The Exorcist	
Characters	The Exorcist	Exorcist II The Heretic	The Exorcist III	Exorcist The Beginning	Dominion Prequel to the Exorcist	The Exorcist Believer	The Exorcist Martyrs	Season 1	Season 2
Characters	1973	1977	1990	2004	2005	2023	2027	2016	2017
Pazuzu Captain Howdy the Salesman	Mercedes McCambridge^{V} Linda Blair^{V} Ron Faber^{V} Eileen Dietz	Karen Knapp^{V}	Colleen Dewhurst^{V}	Rupert Degas^{V}	Mary Beth Hurt^{V}	Allen Nelson^{V} J. Moliere^{V}	TBA	Robert Emmet Lunney	Mentioned
Regan MacNeil Angela Rance	Linda Blair	Linda Blair	Mentioned			Linda Blair^{C}	TBA	Geena Davis^{O}^{M} Sophie Thatcher^{Y}^{R}	Mentioned
Father Merrin	Max von Sydow	Max von Sydow	Mentioned	Stellan Skarsgård^{Y}	Stellan Skarsgård^{Y}	Mentioned		Mentioned	
Christine "Chris" MacNeil	Ellen Burstyn	Mentioned				Ellen Burstyn	TBA	Sharon Gless^{R}	
Father Karras Patient X	Jason Miller		Jason Miller Charles Powell^{B}			Mentioned			
Lt. William Kinderman	Lee J. Cobb		George C. Scott						
Father Dyer	William O'Malley		Ed Flanders						
Producer	William Peter Blatty^{C}								
Sharon Spencer	Kitty Winn	Kitty Winn							
Father Tom Kanavan	Thomas Bermingham		Harry Carey Jr.						
Burke Dennings	Jack MacGowran								
Dr. Klein	Barton Heyman								
Dr. Barringer	Peter Masterson								
Karras' Mother	Vasiliki Maliaros								
Karras' Uncle	Titos Vandis								
Capt. Billy Cutshaw	Dick Callinan								
Dr. Gene Tuskin		Louise Fletcher							
Father Philip Lamont		Richard Burton							
Kokumo		James Earl Jones Joey Green^{Y}							
Edwards		Ned Beatty							
Liz		Belinda Beatty							
Gary Tuskin		Shane Butterworth							
Linda Tuskin		Joely Adams							
Mrs. Phalor		Barbara Cason							
Colonel Vincent Kane			Stacy Keach						
Colonel Fell			Ed Flanders						
Major Groper			Neville Brand						
Nurse Emily Allerton			Nancy Fish						
Nurse Amy Keating			Tracy Thorne						
Captain Fairbanks			George DiCenzo						
Major Nammack			Moses Gunn						
Lieutenant Bennish			Robert Loggia						
Lieutenant Spinell			Joe Spinell						
Lieutenant Gomez			Alejandro Rey						
Sergeant Krebs			Tom Atkins						
James Vennamun The Gemini Killer			Brad Dourif						
Dr. Temple			Scott Wilson						
Sgt. Mel Atkins			Grand L. Bush						
Father Morning			Nicol Williamson						
Nurse X			Viveca Lindfors						
Blind Dream Man			Samuel L. Jackson						
C. Everett Koop			Himself						
Larry King			Himself						
Angel of Death			Patrick Ewing						
Angel			Fabio						
Sergeant-Major Harris				Ralph Brown	Ralph Brown				
Major Granville				Julian Wadham	Julian Wadham				
Chuma				Andrew French	Andrew French				
Jomo				Israel Aduramo	Israel Aduramo				
Emekwi				Eddie Osei	Eddie Osei				
Lieutenant Kessel				Antonie Kamerling	Antonie Kamerling				
Father Francis				James D'Arcy	Gabriel Mann				
Sarah Novak				Izabella Scorupco					
Semelier				Ben Cross					
Joseph				Remy Sweeney					
Father Gionetti				David Bradley					
Jefferies				Alan Ford					
Bession				Patrick O'Kane					
James				James Bellamy					
Dr. Rachel Lesno					Clara Bellar				
Cheche					Billy Crawford Mary Beth Hurt^{V}				
Victor Fielding						Leslie Odom Jr.			
Ann						Ann Dowd			
Miranda West						Jennifer Nettles			
Tony West						Norbert Leo Butz			
Angela Fielding						Lidya Jewett			
Katherine West						Olivia Marcum			
Dr. Beehibe						Okwui Okpokwasili			
Don Revans						Raphael Sbarge			
Stuart						Danny McCarthy			
Father Maddox						E. J. Bonilla			
Sorenne Fielding						Tracey Graves			
Lamashtu						Lize Johnston			
Det. Julie Miller							Scarlett Johansson		
Mary Miller							Diane Lane		
Max Miller							Jacobi Jupe		
Father William							Chiwetel Ejiofor		
Det. Gina Restrepo							Sasha Calle		
Father Sunday							John Leguizamo		
Clay Silver							Scoot McNairy		
Peter Nicks							Gil Bellows		
Father Nichol							Laurence Fishburne		
Father Tomas Ortega								Alfonso Herrera^{M}	Alfonso Herrera^{M}
Father Marcus Keane								Ben Daniels^{M}	Ben Daniels^{M}
Father Bennett								Kurt Egyiawan^{M}	Kurt Egyiawan^{M}
Casey Rance								Hannah Kasulka^{M}	Hannah Kasulka^{G}
Maria Walters								Kirsten Fitzgerald^{R}	Kirsten Fitzgerald^{R}
Cardinal Guillot								Torrey Hanson^{R}	Torrey Hanson^{R}
Katherine "Kat" Rance								Brianne Howey^{M}	Mentioned
Henry Rance								Alan Ruck^{M}	Mentioned
Jessica								Mouzam Makkar^{R}	
Olivia								Camille Guaty^{R}	
Mother Bernadette								Deanna Dunagan^{R}	
Simon the Priest								Francis Guinan^{R}	
Rose Cooper									Li Jun Li^{M}
Verity									Brianna Hildebrand^{M}
Andrew "Andy" Kim									John Cho^{M}
Mouse									Zuleikha Robinson^{M}
David "Truck" Johnson III									Cyrus Arnold^{R}
Caleb									Hunter Dillon^{R}
Shelby									Alex Barima^{R}
Grace									Amélie Eve^{R}
Peter Osborne									Christopher Cousins^{R}
Nicole Kim									Alicia Witt^{R}
Cindy									Zibby Allen^{R}
Harper Graham									Beatrice Kitsos^{R}

== Additional crew and production details ==
Film	Crew/Detail					
Film	Composer(s)	Cinematographer(s)	Editor(s)	Production companies	Distributor(s)	Running time
The Exorcist	Mike Oldfield & Jack Nitzsche	Owen Roizman & Billy Williams	Evan Lottman, Norman Gay & Bud Smith	Hoya Productions	Warner Bros. Pictures	121 minutes
Exorcist II: The Heretic	Ennio Morricone	William A. Fraker	Tom Priestley	Warner Bros. Pictures	Warner Bros. Pictures	102 minutes
The Exorcist III	Barry De Vorzon	Gerry Fisher	Todd Ramsay & Peter Lee-Thompson	Morgan Creek Productions	20th Century Fox	110 minutes
Exorcist: The Beginning	Trevor Rabin	Vittorio Storaro	Mark Goldblatt & Todd E. Miller	Morgan Creek Productions	Warner Bros. Pictures	114 minutes
Dominion: Prequel to the Exorcist	Trevor Rabin & Angelo Badalamenti	Vittorio Storaro	Tim Silano	Morgan Creek Productions	Warner Bros. Pictures	116 minutes
The Exorcist (The Series)	Daniel Hart and Tyler Bates	Alex Disenhof and Byron Shah	Janet Weinberg, Victor Du Bois, Pietro Cecchini, Dana Congdon, Andrew Groves, Benjamin Howdeshell, and Romain Vaunois	20th Century Fox Television, Morgan Creek Entertainment, New Neighborhood Productions	20th Century Fox Television, Fox Network	900 minutes (45 minute episodes)
The Exorcist: Believer	David Wingo, Amman Abbasi	Tim Alverson	Michael Simmonds	Blumhouse Productions, Morgan Creek Entertainment; Rough House Pictures	Universal Pictures	120 minutes
The Exorcist: Martyrs	TBA	Michael Fimognari	Mike Flanagan	Blumhouse–Atomic Monster; Morgan Creek Entertainment, Red Room Pictures	Universal Pictures	—N/a

== Reception ==
=== Box office and financial performance ===
Film	Release date	Box office revenue			Budget	Reference
Film	Release date	United States	Foreign	Worldwide	Budget	Reference
The Exorcist	December 26, 1973	$233,005,644	$136,017,945	$441,306,145^{(R)}	$12 million	
Exorcist II: The Heretic	June 17, 1977	$30,749,142		$30,749,142	$14 million	
The Exorcist III	August 17, 1990	$26,098,824	$12,925,427	$39,024,251	$11 million	
Exorcist: The Beginning	August 20, 2004	$41,821,986	$36,178,600	$78,000,586	$50 million	
Dominion: Prequel to the Exorcist	May 20, 2005	$251,495^{(L)}		$251,495	$30 million	
The Exorcist: Believer	October 6, 2023	$65,537,395	$70,746,823	$136,284,218	$30 million	
Total		$397,129,853^{(A)}	$400,632,905^{(A)}	$797,762,758^{(A)}	$147 million^{(A)}	
List indicators: A dark grey cell indicates the information is not available for the film.; (R) indicates total grosses of the film, including subsequent re-releases; (L) indicates the film had a limited release.; (A) indicates an estimated figure based on available numbers.

=== Critical and public response ===
Film	Rotten Tomatoes	Metacritic	CinemaScore
The Exorcist	78% (178 reviews)	81/100 (21 reviews)	—N/a
Exorcist II: The Heretic	10% (69 reviews)	39/100 (11 reviews)	—N/a
The Exorcist III	60% (47 reviews)	43/100 (19 reviews)	C
Exorcist: The Beginning	10% (131 reviews)	30/100 (22 reviews)	C
Dominion: Prequel to the Exorcist	29% (45 reviews)	55/100 (16 reviews)	—N/a
The Exorcist (The Series)	89% (11 reviews)	62/100 (29 reviews)	—N/a
The Exorcist: Believer	22% (252 reviews)	39/100 (51 reviews)	C

=== Accolades ===
The Exorcist was nominated for ten Academy Awards in 1974, winning two. It was the first horror film to be nominated for Best Picture. The film was also nominated for seven Golden Globes, winning four.

Award	Category	Nominees	Result
Academy Awards	Best Picture	William Peter Blatty	Nominated
Academy Awards	Best Director	William Friedkin	Nominated
Academy Awards	Best Actress	Ellen Burstyn	Nominated
Academy Awards	Best Supporting Actor	Jason Miller	Nominated
Academy Awards	Best Supporting Actress	Linda Blair	Nominated
Academy Awards	Best Screenplay – Based on Material from Another Medium	William Peter Blatty	Won
Academy Awards	Best Art Direction	Bill Malley and Jerry Wunderlich	Nominated
Academy Awards	Best Cinematography	Owen Roizman	Nominated
Academy Awards	Best Film Editing	Jordan Leondopoulos, Bud Smith, Evan A. Lottman and Norman Gay	Nominated
Academy Awards	Best Sound	Robert Knudson and Chris Newman	Won
Golden Globe Awards	Best Motion Picture – Drama		Won
Golden Globe Awards	Best Actress in a Motion Picture – Drama	Ellen Burstyn	Nominated
Golden Globe Awards	Best Supporting Actor – Motion Picture	Max von Sydow	Nominated
Golden Globe Awards	Best Supporting Actress – Motion Picture	Linda Blair	Won
Golden Globe Awards	Best Director – Motion Picture	William Friedkin	Won
Golden Globe Awards	Best Screenplay – Motion Picture	William Peter Blatty	Won
Golden Globe Awards	Most Promising Newcomer – Female	Linda Blair	Nominated

==== Other Accolades and recognitions ====
Award	Film	Year	Category	Nominee(s)	Result
Saturn Award	The Exorcist III	1991	Best Writing	William Peter Blatty	Won
Saturn Award	The Exorcist III	1991	Best Supporting Actor	Brad Dourif	Nominated
Saturn Award	The Exorcist III	1991	Best Horror Film	The Exorcist III	Nominated
Golden Raspberry Award	The Exorcist III	1991	Worst Actor	George C. Scott	Nominated
Golden Raspberry Award	Exorcist: The Beginning	2005	Worst Director	Renny Herlin	Nominated
Golden Raspberry Award	Exorcist: The Beginning	2005	Worst Sequel, Remake, or Rip-off	Exorcist: The Beginning	Nominated
Golden Raspberry Award	The Exorcist: Believer	2024	Worst Picture	Jason Blum, David C. Robinson, and James G. Robinson	Nominated
Golden Raspberry Award	The Exorcist: Believer	2024	Worst Director	David Gordon Green	Nominated
Golden Raspberry Award	The Exorcist: Believer	2024	Worst Screen Combo	Universal Pictures (Note: Nominated as "Any 2 Money-Grubbing Investors Who Donated to the $400 Million for Remake Rights to The Exorcist")	Nominated
Golden Raspberry Award	The Exorcist: Believer	2024	Worst, Sequel, Remake, or Rip-off	The Exorcist: Believer	Nominated
Golden Raspberry Award	The Exorcist: Believer	2024	Worst Screenplay	Peter Sattler and David Gordon Green; story by Scott Teems, Danny McBride, and David Gordon Green (based on characters by William Peter Blatty)	Nominated

American Film Institute recognition:

- 100 Years... 100 Thrills – #3
- 100 Years... 100 Heroes and Villains – Regan MacNeil – Villain #9

In 1991, The Exorcist III won a Saturn Award from the Academy of Science Fiction, Fantasy & Horror Films, USA, for Best Writing and was nominated for two more. However, it was also nominated for Worst Actor at the Golden Raspberry Awards. In 2005, Exorcist: The Beginning was nominated for two Golden Raspberry Awards. In 2024, The Exorcist: Believer was nominated for five Golden Raspberry Awards, but lost all categories it was nominated for to fellow horror film, Winnie the Pooh: Blood and Honey.

== Legacy ==
The success of The Exorcist inspired a string of possession-related films worldwide. The first was Beyond the Door, a 1974 Italian film with Juliet Mills as a woman possessed by the devil. It appeared one year later in the United States. Also in 1974, a Turkish film, Şeytan (Turkish for Satan; the original film was also shown with the same name), is an almost scene-for-scene remake of the original. That same year in Germany, the exorcism-themed film Magdalena, vom Teufel besessen was released. Similarly, a blaxploitation film was released in 1974 titled Abby. While the films Şeytan and Magdalena, vom Teufel besessen were protected from prosecution due to the laws of their countries of origin, Abby's producers (filming in Louisiana) were sued by Warner. The film was pulled from theaters, but not before making $4 million at the box office. In 1975, Britain released The Devil Within Her (also called I Don't Want to Be Born) with Joan Collins as an exotic dancer who gives birth to a demon-possessed child.

Mexican comedians Los Polivoces (The Multivoices) made a copy-parody called El Exorcista. Eduardo Manzano incarned the "possession" and hard make-up was used. Flying clothes were used as "phantoms" and rotoscoping techniques make his bed fly.

A parody called The Exorcist: Italian Style was made in Italy in 1977 by actor and comedian Ciccio Ingrassia. Another parody, Repossessed, was released the same year as The Exorcist III, with Blair lampooning the role that she had played in the original. The prologue for Scary Movie 2 was a short parody of several scenes from the original film.

In 1987, Warner Bros. released an animated short starring Daffy Duck titled "The Duxorcist", which was a parody of The Exorcist, in which a group of spirits possess a female duck. Daffy does eventually succeed in getting them out of the female character.

An episode of The Simpsons titled "Home Sweet Homediddly-Dum-Doodily" features Bart, Lisa, and Maggie getting put under the care of the Flanders family. After Lisa reveals that neither she, Bart nor Maggie is baptized, Ned decides to baptize them. On the way to the baptism, Maggie turns her head around in a way similar to Linda Blair in The Exorcist. The film was also parodied in "Fland Canyon", "Treehouse of Horror", "Treehouse of Horror XVI", and "Treehouse of Horror XXVIII" (with the first segment based entirely on the film).

In Bride of Chucky, when Chucky is on the bed, his head turns all the way around just before killing Damien. Tiffany watches this in excitement.

In the children's horror anthology series Goosebumps, the episode "Cry of the Cat" is about a pair of rude teenage actors making a parody of The Exorcist, with their cat as the possessed being.

In the animated comedy horror series Courage the Cowardly Dog, the episode "The Demon in the Mattress" is a direct spoof of the film, using several plot elements that were lifted straight from The Exorcist. In the episode, Muriel orders a comfy new mattress, not paying attention to the grotesque deliveryman nor the sinister horse-drawn carriage that had delivered it. Unaware of the demon in the mattress, she is later possessed by it when she is sleeping.

In Angel: Earthly Possessions, a spin-off comic story based on the television series Angel, the protagonist Angel finds himself dealing with a priest who performs exorcisms, but comes to realize that the priest is summoning the demons for him to exorcise in the first place. He also makes a note of The Exorcist film, noting that the vision that it created of possession actually made things easier for possession demons by making it harder for humans to know what to expect from a possession.

A meta-reference to the film was made in an episode of Supernatural titled "The Usual Suspects". In the show, demons possessing humans is a common plot element; demons in the series are human souls corrupted by their time in Hell, lacking physical bodies of their own to interact with Earth. Linda Blair appeared in "The Usual Suspects" as a police detective, with the protagonist Dean Winchester finding her character familiar and expressing a strange desire for pea soup at the episode's conclusion.

The film was parodied in The Boondocks episode "Stinkmeaner Strikes Back".

In the episode of Gravity Falls titled "The Inconveniencing", Mabel twisting her head 180 degrees whilst being possessed by a ghost is a reference to a scene in The Exorcist in which Pazuzu, possessing Regan MacNeil, turns its head 180 degrees.

The 2013 disaster comedy film This Is the End referred to the exorcism when Jonah Hill is possessed by a demon and Jay Baruchel performs an exorcism on him by repeating lines from the film.

In the paranormal television series Ghost Adventures, the producers visited the "Exorcist house" for the 100th episode of the series. In the episode, Zak Bagans, Nick Groff, and Aaron Goodwin visit the house to see that an exorcism occurred there in 1949. The episode has been announced as one of the scariest lockdowns since Bobby Mackeys.

In 2014, British author Saurav Dutt released a book titled Pazuzu Unbound, which is set in contemporary times dealing with the demon Pazuzu but which does not deal with the original characters in the film and novel on which the book is inspired.

== Home media ==
A limited-edition box set was released in 1998. It was limited to 50,000 copies, with available copies circulating around the Internet. There are two versions; a special edition VHS and a special edition DVD. The only difference between the two copies is the recording format.

=== On the DVD ===
- The original film with restored film and digitally remastered audio, with a 1.85:1 widescreen aspect ratio.
- An introduction by director William Friedkin.
- The 1998 BBC documentary. The Fear of God: The Making of "The Exorcist".
- 2 audio commentaries.
- Interviews with the director and writer.
- Theatrical trailers and TV spots.

=== In the box ===
- A commemorative 52-page tribute book, covering highlights of the film's preparation, production, and release; features previously unreleased historical data and archival photographs.
- Limited edition soundtrack CD of the film's score, including the original (unused) soundtrack (Tubular Bells and Night of the Electric Insects omitted).
- 8 lobby card reprints.
- Exclusive senitype film frame (magnification included).

=== Blu-ray ===
A Blu-ray edition features a new restoration, including both the 1973 theatrical version and the "version you've never seen" from 2000. It was released on October 5, 2010.

In preparation for the first film's 41st anniversary, the complete collection of the series was released as The Exorcist: The Complete Anthology containing all five films restored on Blu-ray in September 2014. The rest of the installments of the franchise were also given an individual release for the first time on Blu-ray with the exception of Dominion: Prequel to the Exorcist which can only be obtained on Blu-ray by purchasing the collection.

=== Cut scenes ===
Contortionist Linda R. Hager was hired to perform the infamous "spider-walk scene" that was filmed on April 11, 1973. Friedkin deleted the scene just prior to the original December 26, 1973 release date because he felt it was ineffective technically. However, with advanced developments in digital media technology, Friedkin worked with CGI artists to make the scene look more convincing for the 2000 theatrically re-released version of The Exorcist: The Version You've Never Seen. Since the original release, myths and rumors still exist that a variety of spider-walk scenes were filmed despite Friedkin's insistence that no alternate version was ever shot.

In 1998, Warner Brothers re-released the digitally remastered DVD of The Exorcist: 25th Anniversary Special Edition. This DVD includes the special feature BBC documentary, The Fear of God: The Making of The Exorcist, highlighting the never-before-seen original non-bloody version of the spider-walk scene. The updated "bloody version" of the spider-walk scene appears in the 2000 re-release of The Exorcist: The Version You've Never Seen utilizing CGI technology to incorporate the special effect of blood pouring from Regan's mouth during this scene's finale.

== Other media ==
=== Stage ===
In February 2008, American playwright John Pielmeier expressed his interest in adapting William Peter Blatty's novel of the same name into a play and soon met with Blatty. He then began working on a script for the play, in which the first draft was completed within ten days. The Exorcist first premiered at the Geffen Playhouse, Los Angeles in 2012.

=== Radio play ===
A two-part audio dramatisation was broadcast on BBC Radio 4 in 2014. The cast included Robert Glenister as Karras, Alexandra Mathie as the Demon, Lydia Wilson as Regan, Teresa Gallagher as Chris, Karl Johnson as Kinderman, Bryan Dick as Dyer and Ian McDiarmid as Merrin.

=== Video game ===
An episodic video game adaptation exclusive to virtual reality, titled The Exorcist: Legion VR, was developed by Wolf & Wood, Ltd. and published by Fun Train for Steam VR, Meta Quest (formerly Oculus) and PlayStation VR headsets in 2018. The game is loosely based on the premise and events of The Exorcist III.

=== Theme park attraction ===
In 2025, a haunted house attraction called Universal Horror Unleashed features characters from the film franchise.

== Cancelled projects ==
In November 2009, Blatty planned to direct a miniseries of The Exorcist.

In September 2015, Morgan Creek Productions was selling its library of films, while retaining remake and sequel rights to key properties, including The Exorcist. Rumors began circulating that the original film would be remade, which was later denied by Morgan Creek.

In July 2021, when a trilogy of new Exorcist films was announced, two sequels were confirmed to be concurrently in development. David Gordon Green was slated to serve as director, while work on the scripts for the two additional movies was ongoing. By July 2023, the first sequel was officially titled The Exorcist: Deceiver and slated for release on April 18, 2025. On January 11, 2024, the film was removed from Universal's release calendar when Green departed as director as he focused on his production of Nutcrackers starring Ben Stiller, as well as season four of HBO's The Righteous Gemstones. By May 2024, plans for the trilogy were scrapped following the poor reception of Believer.

== See also ==
- The Exorcist: Italian Style or L'esorciccio, a 1975 Italian comedy film that parodies the original 1973 film.
- Possessed, a TV movie claiming to follow the true accounts that inspired Blatty to write The Exorcist.
- Exorcist (disambiguation)
- Exorcism
