= Oliver Stone's unrealized projects =

Films not progressing to production

During his long career, American film director Oliver Stone has worked on several projects which never progressed beyond the pre-production stage under his direction. Some of these projects fell into development hell, were officially cancelled or would see life under a different production team.

== 1970s ==
=== Break ===
One of Stone's first screenplays, Break, was a semi-autobiographical story that would eventually become the basis for Platoon (1986), detailing his experiences during the Vietnam War.

=== The Cover-Up ===
In the early-to mid-1970s, Stone completed the first draft of "a really good screenplay" called The Cover-Up, which English writer Robert Bolt then helped him rewrite at his office in Beverly Hills. The project was Stone's version of the Patty Hearst kidnapping.

=== Second Life ===
In the late 1970s, Stone wrote this unproduced sequel script to Platoon inspired by his own life after the war.

=== Conan ===
Initially, Stone was attached to write and co-direct Conan the Barbarian in the late 1970s alongside Joe Alves, envisioning a "post-apocalyptic tale for the ages". However, John Milius instead took the helm of the film, which was produced by Dino De Laurentiis using a drastically altered version of Stone's script. "The draft I wrote—Conan, the first one I wrote—I always undertook it as one of twelve," Stone later said. "Unfortunately, I feel the producers of the movie misunderstood the real goal and that they sold it short. Arnold [Schwarzenegger] should've come back every year or every two years, like James Bond, and done one."

== 1980s ==
=== Demolished Man ===
In the early 1980s, Stone wrote a screenplay adaptation of Alfred Bester's sci-fi novel The Demolished Man, but it didn't become a film because of technical limitations and Stone's busy writer-director schedule. His draft was later listed as one of the ten best unproduced screenplays on the March 1991 issue of American Film.

=== Untitled South L.A. gang film ===
According to Kathryn Bigelow, Stone was interested in doing a project on South Los Angeles gangs and had requested that she write it with him. Just as Stone was about to start pre-production on it, both Salvador and Platoon received the greenlight and he embarked on directing those instead.

=== Untitled quiz show scandals film ===
After the success of Platoon, Stone wanted his friend and screenwriter Stanley Weiser to research and write a screenplay, for him to direct, about the quiz show scandals of the 1950s.

=== Company Man ===
In 1987, Stone planned to direct a film about the Central Intelligence Agency's involvement in the Contras starring Paul Newman. Titled Company Man, screenwriters Edward Neumeier and Michael Miner began a script while simultaneously working on a RoboCop sequel, both for Orion Pictures. Stone postponed the film to work on Talk Radio (1988) instead.

=== Crazy Horse ===
Also in 1987, Stone and producer Justin Ackerman teamed up for a film adapted from the Peter Matthiessen book In the Spirit of Crazy Horse, for Carolco. Stone discussed the project with Robert Redford, but the film was never made.

== 1990s ==
=== Untitled Howard Hughes biopic ===
Stone had been reportedly in talks with Warner Bros. to direct a movie about Howard Hughes. However, since Warren Beatty owned the rights to make the film, the project never materialized.

=== Untitled Samuel LaBudde biopic ===
In the early 1990s, it was reported that Stone would direct a then-untitled film about Samuel LaBudde, an environmentalist who fought to stop tuna fishermen from killing dolphins.

=== The Mayor of Castro Street ===
In the early 1990s, Stone became friendly with journalist Randy Shilts and purchased the film rights to two of his books, including The Mayor of Castro Street, his 1982 biography of Harvey Milk. Stone was to produce and direct the film adaptation in 1991, starring Robin Williams as Milk. However, after the media furor around JFK and receiving death threats from a fringe activist group called Queer Nation, Stone announced in an interview with The Advocate that he was dropping out of the project as director. In 1992, Stone hired openly gay director Gus Van Sant to direct the film instead, but financing and creative issues between Van Sant and the studio caused Stone and Van Sant to drop out of the project. Fifteen years later, Van Sant directed another biopic about Harvey Milk starring Sean Penn and unrelated to The Mayor of Castro Street.

=== Elektra: Assassin ===
In 1992, Stone was attached to direct the film adaptation of the Marvel Comics’ limited series of the same name, which was eventually adapted as Elektra (2005).

=== Noriega ===
In 1993, Stone was set to direct a biopic about the life of Manuel Noriega for Warner Bros. and film in Panama. On May 28, 1994, Stone cancelled Noriega, had which Al Pacino set to star. Lawrence Wright's script, which was written for Stone, was later produced as the television film Noriega: God's Favorite (2000) starring Bob Hoskins.

=== Return of the Apes ===
In 1994, Stone attempted to produce a Planet of the Apes film titled Return of the Apes, with Arnold Schwarzenegger slated to star. Stone was reportedly paid a million dollars to produce the film. Stone was also slated to direct the film at one point.

=== George Washington ===
In 1995, it was reported that Robert Redford had planned to produce and star in the biopic George Washington, charting Washington's life before the American Revolution and through his presidency. Redford had apparently courted Stone to direct, though they both would eventually depart from the project.

=== Weird Tales TV series ===
In 1995, Stone was reportedly set to collaborate with directors Francis Ford Coppola and Tim Burton on a horror anthology series for HBO based on Weird Tales, the pulp magazine collection of short stories. They each were to serve as executive producers and direct one of three episodes in a 90-minute pilot. Stone's segment was to be written by Mark Patrick Carducci and Peter Atkins.

=== The Treasure of the Sierra Madre ===
Stone had once planned a new version of The Treasure of the Sierra Madre. His idea was to cast Sharon Stone as the "troublemaker" character (previously played by Humphrey Bogart in John Huston's 1948 film adaptation), as well as Jack Nicholson and Al Pacino. This project was presumably mooted in the mid-1990s during Sharon Stone's career-peak of successful films such as Basic Instinct and Casino.

=== Spy vs. Spy ===
In December 1995, it was reported that Stone was considering the screen adaption Spy vs. Spy, from a then-recent article in Spy magazine about investigative reporter Stuart Goldman, for Phoenix Pictures. Stone envisioned the story as a black comedy, and was to work with Scott Alexander and Larry Karaszewski on the script.

=== Mission: Impossible 2 ===
Stone was initially slated to direct Mission: Impossible 2 (2000) during the early stages of its development. He had previously worked with Tom Cruise, who had starred in and produced the first Mission: Impossible (1996), on the film Born on the Fourth of July (1989). Stone described his version of Mission: Impossible 2 as "a vehicle to say something about the state of corporate culture and technology and global politics in the 21st century". He further noted that the film's commercial nature and Cruise's star power would, in a way, "[give him] some camouflage" when delving into overtly political themes. Stone would hire David Marconi to write the script, but the former would ultimately leave the project for unknown reasons.

=== Untitled Bert Kreischer biopic ===
In 1997, Stone acquired the rights to make a film based on Bert Kreischer's trip to Russia.

=== Scud: The Disposable Assassin ===
In 1997, Stone's company optioned the rights to Rob Schrab's science fiction comic Scud: The Disposable Assassin, with an eye towards adapting it into a film, but the rights lapsed.

=== Enemy of the State ===
According to David Marconi, the first director he'd shown his script Enemy of the State to was Stone, who wanted to make it his next film. He reached out to Jerry Bruckheimer and Disney, telling them, "This is a great conspiracy film, and I'd love to do this." Ultimately, Bruckheimer brought in Tony Scott. Marconi believes that, had Stone directed, it would have been a more serious film than it turned out to be.

=== American Psycho ===
In the late 1990s, Stone was hired to direct the adaptation of Bret Easton Ellis's novel American Psycho, with Leonardo DiCaprio portraying Patrick Bateman. Had Stone directed, James Woods would have portrayed Donald Kimball and Cameron Diaz would have portrayed Evelyn Williams. Stone dropped out of the project after DiCaprio left it in favor of The Beach (2000).

=== Memphis (biopic) ===
In the late 1990s, Stone attempted to make Memphis, a biopic about the life of Martin Luther King Jr. The film was to have been distributed by Warner Bros. In October 2013, it was announced that Stone was to make a King biopic for DreamWorks Pictures and WB, with Jamie Foxx playing King. However, Stone confirmed he dropped out of the project due to creative differences as of January 2014. According to Stone, the King estate did not approve of Stone's script because it featured King's adultery.

=== Marching to Valhalla ===
On October 19, 1998, Stone was once attached to direct and produce the film adaptation of Michael Blake’s biographical novel about General George Custer titled Marching to Valhalla for New Line Cinema with Brad Pitt possibly attached to star, after Kathryn Bigelow left the movie.

=== Silver Surfer ===
Stone once expressed interest years ago in helming a Silver Surfer film.

== 2000s ==
=== Superman ===
In February 2000, Stone was involved in the next Superman film at Warner Bros., from a script by Bill Wisher and Jon Peters attached to produce the project at the time. In a March 2000 interview with Stone for E! News, he confirmed his interest in directing the film, when Nicolas Cage was still attached to play the role.

=== A Star Is Born remake ===
On September 15, 2000, Stone was attached to remake A Star is Born (1937) for Warner Bros., with Jamie Foxx attached to star, and Lauryn Hill, Aaliyah and Mariah Carey rumored to play the female lead. Stone left the project and Bradley Cooper would ultimately direct and star in the remake, which was released to theaters in 2018.

=== American Caesar ===
On September 21, 2000, Stone was in negotiations to develop and direct Universal Pictures' thriller American Caesar, about a former war hero who discovers corruption in high places. Douglas Wick and William Nicholson were reportedly set to re-team on the project as producer and screenwriter, respectively, just as they had done with Gladiator.

=== Playboy ===
In the early 2000s,

=== Untitled Margaret Thatcher biopic ===
In December 2004, it was reported that Stone was to make a biopic about British Prime Minister Margaret Thatcher, with Meryl Streep portraying her.

=== Jawbreaker ===
In October 2006, it was announced that Stone would direct an adaptation of CIA agent Gary Berntsen's memoir Jawbreaker: The Attack on bin Laden and al-Qaeda. The film was to star Emilio Estevez as Berntsen.

=== Pinkville ===
In August 2007, it was announced that Stone was going to make Pinkville, a dramatization about the Mỹ Lai massacre. Pinkville would have been Stone's fourth film related to the Vietnam War. The film was to have starred Bruce Willis, Channing Tatum and Woody Harrelson. Xzibit was also to have appeared in the film. However, on November that same year, the project was postponed by its distributor, United Artists, in the wake of the 2007–08 Writers Guild of America strike. In January 2008, it was announced that the project was officially cancelled. It was later reported in December 2010 that Stone had spoken with Shia LaBeouf about considering to revive Pinkville with the latter starring. Stone tweeted in 2014, "Yes, Pinkville is still on the agenda, but recognize there are large costs against it and its a film that's not in the climate of the time."

=== Helter Skelter ===
In May 2009, Stone was said to be in talks with Vincent Bugliosi to adapt his book Helter Skelter: The True Story of The Manson Murders to film.

== 2010s ==
=== Travis McGee ===
In March 2010, it was reported that Stone would develop and possibly direct Travis McGee, based on the eponymous fictional detective character created by author John D. MacDonald. Leonardo DiCaprio was attached to star and produce the film for 20th Century Fox, which would have been based on the first of MacDonald's novels; The Deep Blue Good-by. Stone was replaced as director by Paul Greengrass after he committed to direct Savages (2012). James Mangold was also attached to a version, until Fox cancelled the film.

=== Memphis (musical) ===
In August 2010, it was reported that Stone expressed interest in making a film adaptation of the musical Memphis and wanted Justin Timberlake to star in it.

=== Untitled conspiratorial thriller series ===
In March 2011, Stone was confirmed to direct and produce Adam Gibgot's conspiracy theory focused TV series through Richard Branson’s Virgin Produced company for FX.

=== The Power Broker ===
In October 2011, Stone was set to direct and produce the film The Power Broker, a biopic about Robert Moses for HBO, with Peter Guber and James Gandolfini producing and Nicholas Meyer writing the screenplay. Gandolfini was tentatively set to star as Moses. The project was cancelled in 2013 after Gandolfini's death.

=== The Last Tour ===
Stone was attached to the project for two years until dropping out in 2016.

=== Guantanamo TV series ===
On May 22, 2017, Stone was confirmed to direct a two-hour long pilot of Daniel Voll's Guantanamo Bay TV series through Weinstein Television. which was acquired by Showtime on July 13, 2017. Later, in October 2017, Stone and Showtime dropped out of the series in the wake of Harvey Weinstein's sexual abuse scandal, stating they would not proceed with the series if The Weinstein Company was still involved.

=== Dolce Vita TV series ===
On October 31, 2018, Stone was set to direct the pilot episode for the period drama series Dolce Vita, with Tom Fontana writing the script inspired from Stephen Gundle's 2011 true crime novel Death and Dolce Vita: The Dark Side of Rome in the 1950s. eOne had acquired the television rights to produce the adaptation, alongside Mediaset Group and Martha De Laurentiis' De Laurentiis Company.

== Offers ==
=== Cortes ===
In 1988, Stone was offered to direct Cortes, a historical epic about Hernan Cortes from a Nicholas Kazan screenplay and with Edward R. Pressman producing; but, he turned it down, and Kazan and Pressman couldn't get the project funded.

=== Untitled J. Robert Oppenheimer biopic ===
Stone tweeted in 2023 that he was once offered to make a film based on the life of J. Robert Oppenheimer saying "I couldn't find my way to its essence" at the time.
