= Sexorcism =

Sexorcism may refer to:

- Sexorcism (Lordi album), 2018
- Sexorcism (Brooke Candy album), 2019

== See also ==
- The Sexorcist (film)
- Exorcism (disambiguation)
