= Exorcist: The Beginning =

2004 film by Renny Harlin

- Theatrical release poster
- Directed by: Renny Harlin
- Screenplay by: Alexi Hawley
- Story by: William Wisher; Caleb Carr
- Based on: Characters by William Peter Blatty
- Produced by: James G. Robinson
- Starring: Stellan Skarsgård; Izabella Scorupco; James D'Arcy
- Cinematography: Vittorio Storaro
- Edited by: Mark Goldblatt; Todd E. Miller
- Music by: Trevor Rabin
- Production company: Morgan Creek Productions
- Distributed by: Warner Bros. Pictures
- Release date: August 20, 2004
- Running time: 114 minutes
- Country: United States
- Language: English
- Budget: $50 million
- Box office: $78.1 million

Exorcist: The Beginning is a 2004 American supernatural horror film serving as a prequel to The Exorcist (1973), and the fourth installment in The Exorcist film series. Directed by Renny Harlin, the film stars Stellan Skarsgård, Izabella Scorupco and James D'Arcy. The film follows Father Lankester Merrin, whose faith has been renounced after his experiences in World War II, as he works as an archeologist and discovers dark occurrences while excavating in Kenya.

The film was retooled from Paul Schrader's nearly-completed Dominion: Prequel to the Exorcist, which Morgan Creek Productions executives feared would be unsuccessful. Morgan Creek commissioned The Beginning with the emphasis of featuring more scares and gore. In addition to Harlin replacing Schrader, Hawley rewrote William Wisher and Caleb Carr's original script, while Mark Goldblatt and Todd E. Miller replaced Tim Silano as editors.

Exorcist: The Beginning was released in the United States on August 20, 2004, by Warner Bros. Pictures. The film received negative reviews from critics and grossed over $78 million against a $50 million production budget. Dominion was released the following year to slightly more favorable reviews.

== Plot ==
In the age of the Byzantine Empire, an injured priest wanders through the aftermath of a bloody and desolate battlefield. He comes across an impaled priest in his death throes holding a Pazuzu head pendant. The priest looks around him and sees hundreds of Byzantine soldiers crucified upside down across the desert.

In Cairo, Egypt, in 1949, a young Father Lankester Merrin struggles with his shattered faith. He is haunted by an incident in a small village in the occupied Netherlands during World War II, where he served as parish priest: near the end of the war, sadistic Nazi SS Lieutenant Kessel, in retaliation for the murder of a German trooper, forced Merrin to participate in arbitrary executions to save a full village from slaughter.

Merrin is approached by a collector of antiquities named Semelier who invites him to come to a British excavation in a valley called Derati in the Turkana region of British Kenya. The dig excavates a Christian Byzantine-era church built circa 500 AD—long before Christianity had reached that region of Africa. Semelier asks Merrin to recover an ancient relic of a demon thought to be in the church, before the British can find it. Merrin agrees and travels to the dig site. Father Francis joins him.

Upon arriving at the site with their translator and guide Chuma, Merrin meets the chief excavator, a British man named Jefferies with visible boils on his face, and Sarah Novak, a doctor. In addition, Merrin learns that the diggers are disappearing or leaving in droves because the local tribesmen fear the church is cursed. Merrin witnesses a digger inexplicably experience a seizure.

Merrin, Chuma and Francis visit the dig site and find only the dome uncovered; the rest of the church is buried beneath the earth. Merrin discovers that the church is in perfect condition, as though it had been buried immediately after its construction. The three enter the church through the dome and find the place in near-pristine condition, but note two disturbing oddities; the statues of the angels holding weapons point their spears downward instead of triumphantly toward heaven and someone has vandalized and desecrated the church, placing the cross in an upside-down position. Merrin and Francis deduce that the sculptors were trying to depict the angels restraining something beneath the church.

Determined to learn more about the archaeological dig, Merrin asks to consult with the lead archaeologist, Monsieur Bession. Sarah tells Merrin that Bession went insane three weeks earlier and was transferred to a mental hospital in Nairobi. Merrin visits Bession's tent at the dig site and sees dozens of drawings of the same demon artifact the collector had asked Merrin to find. Merrin visits Bession, but when he enters his room, he discovers Bession has carved a swastika on his chest and is speaking in the voice of Kessel, who tormented Merrin during the war. Bession then slashes his own throat after saying he is "free". Father Gionetti, warden of the asylum, speculates that Bession was not possessed but rather "touched" by a demon, which drove him mad and eventually to suicide. Merrin is very skeptical, but before he returns to the dig site, Father Gionetti gives him the volume of Roman rituals to use in exorcism, although Merrin claims he will never use them.

Upon returning to the village, strange events continue. James, a local boy, is attacked and killed by hyenas that seem to continuously stalk the dig. His younger brother, Joseph, enters a fugue state after watching James get ripped to pieces. The local chief Sebituana's wife gives birth to a stillborn baby who is covered in maggots and Jefferies gets attacked in the bar. Around the same time, Merrin discovers a passageway leading to a cave underneath the church that houses an ancient pagan temple with the statue of the demon Pazuzu. He also finds evidence that this temple was used to conduct human sacrifices. Upon his return, he sees the local tribe cremate the stillborn baby. This makes Merrin suspicious because there are stories of an epidemic that wiped out an entire village in the valley 50 years earlier. He had been told that the dead were buried, not cremated, in a graveyard just outside the valley. When he digs up the graves of the supposed victims of this plague, they are empty.

Merrin confronts Father Francis about it, and Francis reveals to him the history of the Derati valley. A great army led by two priests came to the valley searching for the origin of evil 1,500 years prior. When they arrived in the valley, the evil presence consumed them and one killed the other. When the lone surviving priest made it back, Emperor Justinian ordered a church be built over the site, and then buried to seal the evil force inside of it. The builders of the church never meant it to be recorded in Vatican documents, however, a vague reference to it was recorded and found in 1893. Four priests subsequently came to Derati and enlisted the local tribe to help them. All of the tribesmen and the priests disappeared. The Vatican then ordered that the false graveyard be built and stories of a plague spread around to keep people away from the valley. Francis reveals that it is believed that the valley in Derati was the traditional spot of Lucifer's fall after the war in Heaven. Later Merrin, Chuma and Major Granville discover Jefferies tied up in the Church, with his organs pecked out by crows.

Merrin discovers that Sarah is Bession's wife and is the possessed individual. She kills Francis before Merrin has the demon exorcised from her in the tunnels below the church, and she dies. Merrin and Joseph emerge from the church, (once again buried in the sand) and history has repeated itself. Only Father Merrin and Joseph are left as the British soldiers and the local tribes have annihilated each other after blaming each other for the strange occurrences. Sometime later Merrin, once again a priest, returns to Rome and meets with Semelier at a café, explaining he was unable to find the relic; Semelier replies: "But you found something... didn't you?"

== Cast ==
- Stellan Skarsgård as Father Lankester Merrin
- Izabella Scorupco as Sarah
- James D'Arcy as Father Francis
- Remy Sweeney as Joseph
- Julian Wadham as Major Granville
- Andrew French as Chuma
- Ralph Brown as Sergeant Major
- Ben Cross as Semelier
- David Bradley as Father Gionetti
- Alan Ford as Jefferies
- Antonie Kamerling as Lieutenant Kessel
- Eddie Osei as Emekwi
- Israel Aduramo as Jomo
- Patrick O'Kane as Bession
- James Bellamy as James
- Rupert Degas as Pazuzu (uncredited)

== Production ==
Producer James G. Robinson first began development on an untitled prequel to The Exorcist (1973) in 1997, with the first draft of the screenplay penned by William Wisher Jr. In October 1999, Morgan Creek Productions hired Tom McLoughlin to helm the film. With a script finally in place, production was slated to occur the following spring in Africa. McLoughlin departed due to issues with the script. In October 2001, numerous publications reported that John Frankenheimer was on board as director, with a new screenplay revised by Caleb Carr. Liam Neeson was attached to portray the character of Father Lankester Merrin. William Peter Blatty, author of The Exorcist and screenwriter/producer of its film adaptation, was not expected to take part in the production. After a July 2003 release date was slotted, Frankenheimer was forced to step down from the project due to his declining health and was replaced by Paul Schrader. Gabriel Mann joined the cast in April 2002, while shooting was expected to take place in the spring in the United Kingdom and Spain. The following month, the film was officially titled Exorcist: The Beginning and Stellan Skarsgård and Billy Crawford were added to the cast, the former of which replacing Neeson. Principal photography on Schrader's film began on November 11, 2002, in Morocco with Vittorio Storaro handling cinematography duties. The crew spent six weeks filming in Morocco and then a further two months in Rome. By the time filming had wrapped in February 2003, six writers had contributed to the screenplay and the budget had nearly doubled.

An early cut of Schrader's film that ran at 130 minutes was shown to the studio in early 2003. The cut was widely derided due to a lack of scares and gore. The studio at first opted to re-edit the film to make it scarier, which Schrader opposed. Additional photography was then planned, which according to Schrader only grew "bigger and bigger" as time went on. Schrader attested that he faithfully adapted Carr's screenplay on screen and that the studio went through "buyer's remorse" during production. Later reports indicated that Schrader was first given the option to re-edit the film twice, with neither cut managing to satisfy the studio. Sheldon Kahn was brought in to re-cut the film without Schrader's involvement. Schrader was "livid" and reportedly demanded that Kahn leave. By then, the studio had met with other filmmakers to direct new scenes to make the film scarier. Carr was expected for rewrites, but instead the studio opted to fire Schrader and scrap the film entirely in August 2003. Morgan Creek searched for a new director starting in October.

Renny Harlin was among the directors who met with Robinson and suggested rewriting the script, casting new actors and adding more action. The studio was impressed and hired Harlin. Harlin quickly began overseeing rewrites by Skip Woods. Alexi Hawley and Harlin himself penned subsequent revisions. Skarsgård and Julian Wadham were the only cast members retained from the original shoot. In November 2003, special makeup effects artist Gary J. Tunnicliffe confirmed he would be involved with the film. Filming under Harlin's direction began in the winter of 2003 in Rome. Two weeks into production, the director's leg was shattered after being struck by a car, resulting in a two-week hiatus for filming. Harlin shot six weeks on crutches. Production concluded after twelve weeks. By June 2004, work was still being done on the film. The film was finished mere days before its official release. After initially being given a $35 million budget under Schrader's direction, the reshoots and post-production work ballooned the film's budget to over $90 million.

== Release ==
Exorcist: The Beginning was released theatrically on August 20, 2004, by Warner Bros. Pictures.

=== Home media ===
The film was released on DVD and VHS on March 1, 2005. The film was released for the first time on Blu-ray on September 23, 2014. Sony Pictures Home Entertainment re-released the film on October 13, 2020.

== Reception ==
=== Box office ===
Exorcist: The Beginning grossed $41.8 million in the United States and Canada, and $36.2 million in international territories, for a worldwide total of $78.1 million. On its opening weekend, the film grossed $18 million, earning the top spot at the box office.

=== Critical reception ===
On the review aggregator website Rotten Tomatoes, 11% of 132 critics' reviews are positive, with an average rating of 3.6/10. The website's consensus reads: "A mediocre, gory horror film, nowhere near the quality of the 1973 original." Metacritic, which uses a weighted average, assigned the film a score of 30 out of 100, based on 22 critics, indicating "generally unfavorable" reviews. Audiences polled by CinemaScore gave the film an average grade of "C" on an A+ to F scale.

Blatty said that watching Exorcist: The Beginning was his "most humiliating professional experience". On the other hand, Blatty said that Dominion is "a handsome, classy, elegant piece of work". Roger Ebert wrote: "I've seen both versions and much prefer Schrader's, and yet it must be said that Harlin did not prostitute himself in his version".

Exorcist: The Beginning was nominated for two Golden Raspberry Awards, Worst Director and Worst Remake or Sequel, but lost to two other Warner Bros. films, Catwoman and Scooby-Doo 2: Monsters Unleashed, respectively, at the 25th Golden Raspberry Awards.
