= 2010 United States Senate election in New York =

- November 2, 2010
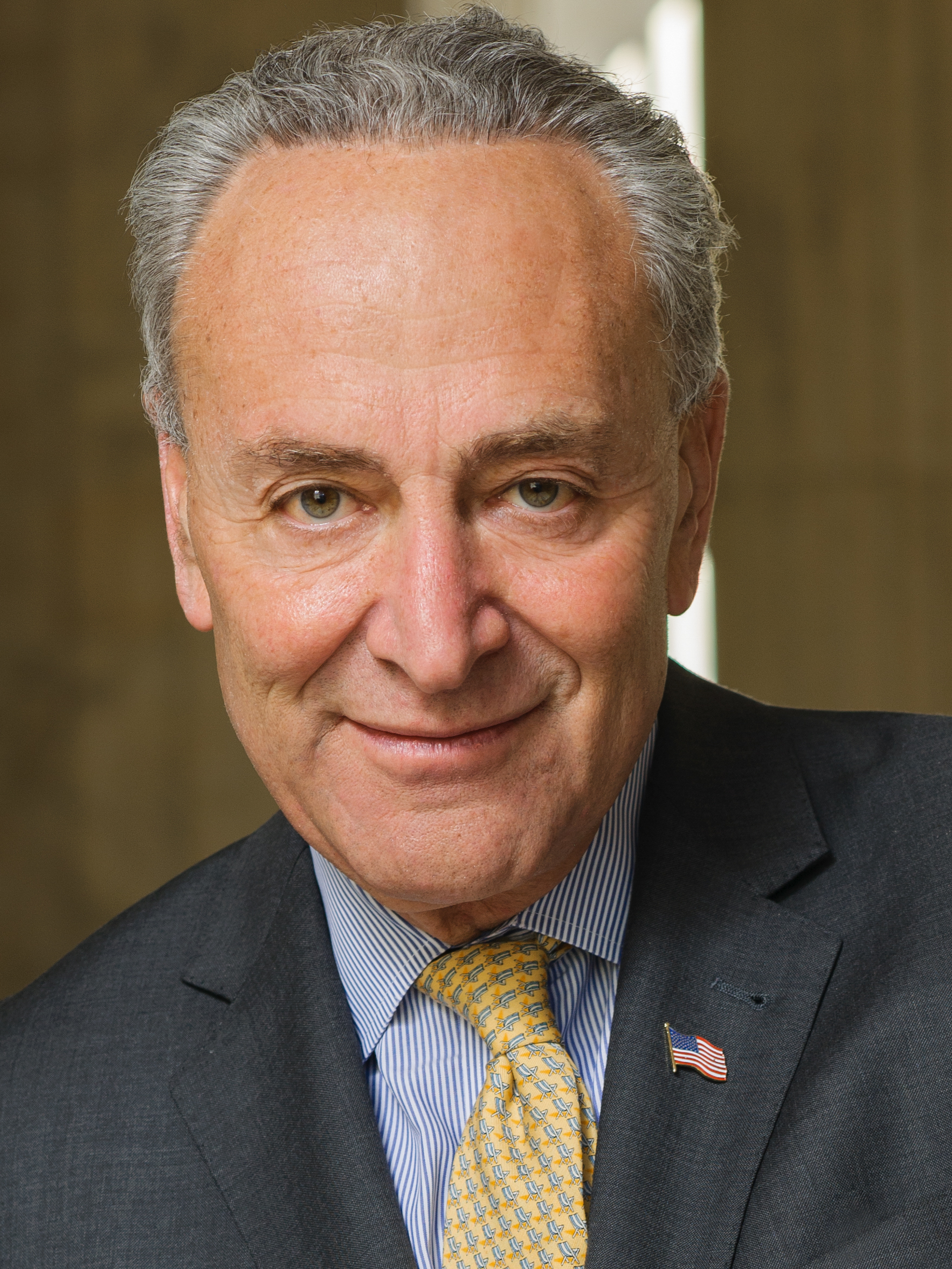

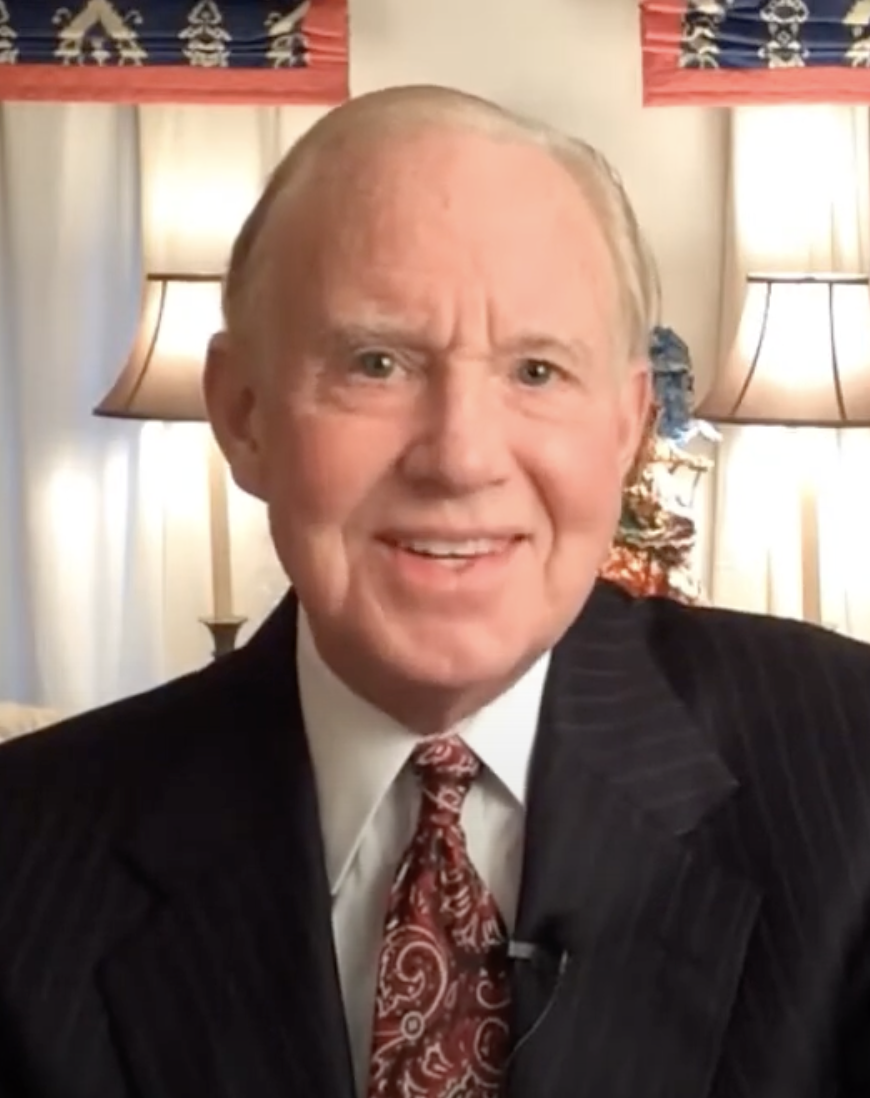
Nominee	Chuck Schumer	Jay Townsend
Party	Democratic	Republican
Alliance	Parties: Working Families; Independence	Conservative
Popular vote	3,047,111	1,479,724
Percentage	66.31%	32.20%
- County results Schumer: 40–50% 50–60% 60–70% 70–80% 80–90% >90% Townsend: 40–50% 50–60%
U.S. senator before election
Chuck Schumer
Democratic
Elected U.S. Senator
Chuck Schumer
Democratic

The 2010 United States Senate election in New York took place on November 2, 2010, along with elections to the United States Senate in other states, as well as elections to the United States House of Representatives and various state and local elections. Incumbent Democrat U.S. Senator Chuck Schumer won re-election to a third term. Schumer won every county except for Wyoming, Tioga, and Hamilton counties.

== Background ==
In the 2004 U.S. Senate election, Schumer had defeated Republican Assemblyman Howard Mills by a 71 to 24 percent margin. Schumer was highly popular in New York, and it was believed that any Republican contender would likely not fare well against him in 2010. Schumer was heavily favored to retain his seat.

In addition to this regular election, there was also a special election to fill the Senate seat vacated by Hillary Clinton, who became the United States Secretary of State on January 21, 2009. In addition, there was the New York gubernatorial election. The existence of two other top-level statewide races, one with a Democratic incumbent perceived as vulnerable and the other an open race, respectively, was believed to lead major New York Republicans to gravitate towards them rather than challenge the popular Schumer.

== Republican nomination ==
=== Convention ===
==== Candidates ====
- Gary Berntsen, retired CIA officer, received the party's endorsement on the second round of balloting
- Martin Chicon, candidate for New York Senate in 2008 and New York Republican State Committee member from upper Manhattan.
- George Maragos, Nassau County Comptroller
- James Staudenraus, Long Island resident and 2008 state assembly candidate
- Jay Townsend, Republican strategist (finished second and also qualified for the primary)

==== Results ====
Only two candidates, Berntsen and Townsend, obtained at least 25% of the vote at the New York State Republican Convention on June 1, 2010. Berntsen came in first, but still needed to win the primary in order to win the Republican nomination. Berntsen lost the primary to Jay Townsend.

=== Primary ===
==== Candidates ====
- Gary Berntsen
- Jay Townsend

==== Results ====
Results by county: Townsend: 50–60%; 60–70%; 70–80%; Berntsen: 50–60%; 60–70%

Republican primary results
Party	Candidate	Votes	%
Republican	Jay Townsend	234,440	55.41%
Republican	Gary Berntsen	188,628	44.59%
Total votes		423,068	100.00%

== General election ==
=== Candidates ===
- Anti-Prohibition Party: Randy Credico
- Conservative Party of New York: Jay Townsend
- Democratic Party: Chuck Schumer
- Green Party: Colia Clark
- Libertarian Party: Randy Credico
- Republican Party: Jay Townsend
- Taxpayers Party: Gary Berntsen

=== Predictions ===
Source	Ranking	As of
Cook Political Report	Solid D	October 26, 2010
Rothenberg	Safe D	October 22, 2010
RealClearPolitics	Safe D	October 26, 2010
Sabato's Crystal Ball	Safe D	October 21, 2010
CQ Politics	Safe D	October 26, 2010

=== Fundraising ===
Candidate (party)	Receipts	Disbursements	Cash on hand	Debt
Chuck Schumer (D)	$17,302,006	$11,824,587	$16,048,482	$0
Jay Townsend (R)	$197,365	$180,693	$16,671	$105,854
Source: Federal Election Commission

=== Polling ===
Poll source	Date(s) administered	Sample size	Margin of error	Chuck Schumer (D)	Jay Townsend (R)	Other	Undecided
Siena College	May 17–20, 2010	808	± 3.4%	63%	24%	—	13%
Siena College	June 7–9, 2010	808	± 3.4%	60%	26%	—	14%
Rasmussen Reports	June 16, 2010	500	± 4.5%	54%	33%	6%	6%
Siena College	July 12, 2010	808	± 3.4%	63%	26%	—	13%
Rasmussen Reports	September 16, 2010	500	± 4.5%	58%	36%	3%	4%
Survey USA	September 20, 2010	1,000	± 4.2%	54%	33%	10%	3%
Angus Reid Public Opinion	October 7, 2010	500	± 4.5%	63%	27%	6%	—
Rasmussen Reports	October 19, 2010	500	± 4.5%	59%	31%	5%	5%
Angus Reid Public Opinion	October 28–29, 2010	541	± 4.2%	61%	35%	4%	—
Siena College	October 27–30, 2010	603	± 4.0%	64%	32%	—	2%

=== Results ===
United States Senate election in New York, 2010
Party	Candidate	Votes	%	±%
Democratic	Chuck Schumer	2,686,043	58.45%	−6.97%
Working Families	Chuck Schumer	183,672	4.00%	+1.48%
Independence	Chuck Schumer	177,396	3.86%	+0.63%
Total	Chuck Schumer (incumbent)	3,047,111	66.31%	−5.85%
Republican	Jay Townsend	1,238,947	26.96%	+2.72%
Conservative	Jay Townsend	240,777	5.24%	+1.94%
Total	Jay Townsend	1,479,724	32.20%	+7.96%
Green	Colia Clark	42,340	0.92%	+0.37%
Libertarian	Randy Credico	24,863	0.54%	+0.26%
Write ins	Write ins	1,337	0.03%	
Total votes		4,595,375	100.00%	N/A
Democratic hold				

==== Results by county ====
County	Chuck Schumer Democratic		Jay Townsend Republican		Various candidates		Margin		Total votes cast
County	#	%	#	%	#	%	#	%	Total votes cast
Albany	67,363	66.7%	31,140	30.8%	2,466	2.4%	36,223	35.9%	100,969
Allegany	6,432	49.5%	6,354	48.9%	219	1.7%	78	0.6%	13,005
Bronx	155,292	90.1%	15,553	9.0%	1,513	0.9%	139,739	81.1%	172,358
Broome	32,768	54.2%	26,569	44.0%	1,100	1.8%	6,199	10.2%	60,437
Cattaraugus	11,874	54.5%	9,561	43.9%	361	1.6%	2,313	10.6%	21,796
Cayuga	13,592	61.6%	7,990	36.2%	479	2.1%	5,602	25.4%	22,061
Chautauqua	21,791	55.7%	16,752	42.8%	578	1.5%	5,039	12.9%	39,121
Chemung	13,927	57.7%	9,951	41.2%	278	1.2%	3,976	16.5%	24,156
Chenango	7,259	52.2%	6,308	45.4%	341	2.4%	951	6.8%	13,908
Clinton	14,128	63.3%	7,842	35.2%	337	1.5%	6,286	28.1%	22,307
Columbia	14,157	60.6%	8,671	37.1%	546	2.4%	5,486	23.5%	23,374
Cortland	8,046	58.9%	5,369	39.3%	255	1.8%	2,677	19.6%	13,670
Delaware	6,787	49.9%	6,503	47.8%	311	2.3%	284	2.1%	13,601
Dutchess	46,121	54.8%	36,801	43.7%	1,263	1.5%	9,320	11.1%	84,185
Erie	190,417	64.4%	100,302	33.9%	4,815	1.7%	90,115	30.5%	295,534
Essex	7,057	57.6%	4,949	40.4%	249	2.0%	2,108	17.2%	12,255
Franklin	7,428	62.5%	4,266	35.9%	192	1.6%	3,162	26.6%	11,886
Fulton	7,326	50.5%	6,960	48.0%	226	1.5%	366	2.5%	14,512
Genesee	9,069	51.6%	8,214	46.8%	287	1.6%	855	4.8%	17,570
Greene	8,076	50.8%	7,547	47.5%	272	1.7%	529	2.3%	15,895
Hamilton	1,149	44.7%	1,368	53.2%	54	2.0%	−219	−8.5%	2,571
Herkimer	10,718	56.3%	8,018	42.1%	296	1.5%	2,700	13.2%	19,032
Jefferson	16,527	62.4%	9,654	36.4%	311	1.2%	6,873	26.0%	26,492
Kings	327,872	83.4%	59,372	15.1%	5,876	1.5%	268,500	68.3%	393,120
Lewis	4,196	57.6%	2,965	40.7%	120	1.7%	1,231	16.9%	7,281
Livingston	10,262	53.2%	8,740	45.3%	299	1.5%	1,522	7.9%	19,301
Madison	11,706	55.9%	8,768	41.8%	482	2.3%	2,938	14.1%	20,596
Monroe	142,858	62.8%	80,992	35.6%	3,460	1.4%	61,866	27.2%	227,310
Montgomery	7,325	53.6%	6,051	44.3%	294	2.1%	1,274	9.3%	13,670
Nassau	230,103	59.6%	152,797	39.6%	3,320	0.9%	77,306	20.0%	386,220
New York	298,926	85.1%	45,823	13.0%	6,534	1.9%	253,103	72.1%	351,283
Niagara	36,792	57.2%	26,555	41.3%	1,012	1.6%	10,237	15.9%	64,359
Oneida	39,924	59.2%	26,472	39.3%	1,021	1.5%	13,452	19.9%	67,417
Onondaga	91,733	64.5%	47,116	33.1%	3,318	2.3%	44,617	31.4%	142,167
Ontario	19,242	56.7%	14,174	41.8%	511	1.4%	5,068	14.9%	33,927
Orange	54,212	56.1%	41,077	42.5%	1,429	1.4%	13,135	13.6%	96,718
Orleans	5,597	51.2%	5,158	47.2%	182	1.6%	439	4.0%	10,937
Oswego	18,286	58.6%	12,182	39.0%	744	2.4%	6,104	19.6%	31,212
Otsego	9,962	55.8%	7,511	42.1%	387	2.2%	2,451	13.7%	17,860
Putnam	16,447	52.4%	14,549	46.4%	389	1.2%	1,898	6.0%	31,385
Queens	266,147	79.6%	64,567	19.3%	3,851	1.1%	201,580	60.3%	334,565
Rensselaer	31,645	59.6%	20,302	38.2%	1,169	2.2%	11,343	21.4%	53,116
Richmond	55,897	58.1%	39,445	41.0%	936	0.9%	16,452	17.1%	96,278
Rockland	51,652	61.3%	31,847	37.8%	777	0.9%	19,805	23.5%	84,276
St. Lawrence	18,908	67.0%	8,813	31.2%	495	1.7%	10,095	35.8%	28,216
Saratoga	43,823	54.6%	34,973	43.6%	1,482	1.8%	8,850	11.0%	80,278
Schenectady	28,388	59.6%	18,124	38.1%	1,111	2.4%	10,264	21.5%	47,623
Schoharie	5,182	50.1%	4,948	47.8%	220	2.1%	234	2.3%	10,350
Schuyler	3,134	53.4%	2,628	44.8%	103	1.7%	506	8.6%	5,865
Seneca	5,922	59.8%	3,799	38.3%	187	1.9%	2,123	21.5%	9,908
Steuben	14,180	52.3%	12,525	46.2%	389	1.4%	1,655	6.1%	27,094
Suffolk	224,677	57.6%	160,865	41.3%	4,252	1.1%	63,812	16.3%	389,794
Sullivan	12,099	57.9%	8,383	40.1%	404	1.9%	3,716	17.8%	20,886
Tioga	7,096	44.5%	8,563	53.7%	297	1.9%	-1,467	-9.2%	15,956
Tompkins	20,728	71.2%	7,599	26.1%	786	2.6%	13,129	45.1%	29,113
Ulster	36,268	60.8%	21,788	36.5%	1,591	2.7%	14,480	24.3%	59,467
Warren	13,363	59.3%	8,795	39.0%	376	1.7%	4,568	20.3%	22,534
Washington	10,288	57.7%	7,141	40.1%	400	2.2%	3,147	17.6%	17,829
Wayne	13,781	51.7%	12,412	46.6%	468	1.8%	1,369	5.1%	26,661
Westchester	171,334	65.9%	86,084	33.1%	2,711	1.0%	85,250	32.8%	260,129
Wyoming	6,018	48.5%	6,092	49.1%	295	2.4%	−74	−0.6%	12,405
Yates	3,834	54.5%	3,087	43.9%	113	1.6%	747	10.6%	7,034
Totals	3,047,111	66.31%	1,479,724	32.20%	68,540	1.49%	1,567,387	34.11%	4,595,375

Counties that flipped from Democratic to Republican

- Tioga (largest municipality: Waverly)
- Wyoming (largest municipality: Perry)

== Aftermath ==
Credico sued the New York State Board of Elections under the Equal Protection Clause of the Fourteenth Amendment, claiming unfair treatment regarding ballot access. Despite being nominated by both the Libertarian Party and the Anti-Prohibition Party, in most jurisdictions, he only appeared on the ballot once. On June 19, 2013, the Federal District Court for the Eastern District of New York ruled in favor of Credico. The New York State Board of Elections did not appeal this decision.
