= Exorcist (disambiguation) =

An exorcist in some religions is a person who is believed to be able to cast out the devil or other demons.

Exorcist may also refer to:

== Literature ==
- The Exorcists, a 1965 supernatural horror novel by Lionel Fanthorpe under the pen name John E. Muller
- The Exorcist (novel), a 1971 horror novel by William Peter Blatty

== Films, plays and TV ==
- The Exorcist (franchise), a number of releases in different media based on the fictional story from the 1971 novel:
  - The Exorcist, a 1973 film adapted from the novel
  - The Exorcist (play), a 2012 play by John Pielmeier based on the novel
  - The Exorcist (TV series), a 2016 television series based on the novel and the film series
- The Exorcist: Italian Style, a 1975 Italian comedy film
- Echorsis, a 2016 Philippine dark comedy film
- The Exorcists, a 2023 American mockbuster horror film

== Music ==
- "The Exorcist", a 1985 song by Possessed from Seven Churches

== See also ==
- List of exorcists
- Exorcism (disambiguation)
