= Jawbreaker: The Attack on bin Laden and al-Qaeda =

Book by Gary Berntsen

Jawbreaker: The attack on bin Laden and al-Qaeda
- Author: Gary Berntsen and Ralph Pezzullo
- Language: English
- Genre: Biography, Political, Military
- Publisher: Crown
- Publication date: 27 December 2005
- Publication place: United States
- Media type: Print (Hardcover, Paperback)
- Pages: 328 (Hardcover edition)
- ISBN: 0-307-23740-0 (Hardcover edition)
- OCLC: 60798451
- Dewey Decimal: 327.1273/009/0511 22
- LC Class: JK468.I6 B427 2005

Jawbreaker: The Attack on Bin Laden and Al-Qaeda: A Personal Account by the CIA's Key Field Commander (2005) is an autobiographical book by CIA agent Gary Berntsen describing the time he spent in Afghanistan at the beginning of the American campaign against the Taliban, al-Qaeda and Osama bin Laden after the September 11, 2001 attacks.

In his acknowledgements, Berntsen describes that his original manuscript was reviewed by the CIA per agency guidelines that stipulate all publishable works detailing an agent's career must be reviewed by the CIA's Publications Review Board (PRB). The text of the book contains redactions to indicate where material has been censored to protect information and context the CIA deems classified.

In October 2006, Paramount Pictures announced that Oliver Stone would direct a film based on Berntsen's book, the rights to which had been bought earlier in the year. This would follow Stone's 2006 film, World Trade Center, the September 11th attacks. This has yet to come to fruition.

== Release details ==
- 2005, United States, Crown Publishers ISBN 0-307-23740-0, Pub date 27 December 2005, Hardcover
- 2006, United States, Three Rivers Press ISBN 0-307-35106-8, Pub date 24 December 2006, Paperback

== See also ==
- Battle of Tora Bora
- Operation Enduring Freedom
- Special Activities Division
