= Dominion: Prequel to the Exorcist =

2005 film by Paul Schrader

- Theatrical release poster
- Directed by: Paul Schrader
- Written by: William Wisher; Caleb Carr
- Based on: Characters by William Peter Blatty
- Produced by: James G. Robinson
- Starring: Stellan Skarsgård; Gabriel Mann; Clara Bellar; Billy Crawford
- Cinematography: Vittorio Storaro
- Edited by: Tim Silano
- Music by: Trevor Rabin; Angelo Badalamenti; Dog Fashion Disco
- Production company: Morgan Creek Productions
- Distributed by: Warner Bros. Pictures
- Release dates: March 18, 2005 (BIFFF); May 20, 2005 (United States)
- Running time: 116 minutes
- Country: United States
- Language: English
- Budget: $30 million
- Box office: $251,495

Dominion: Prequel to the Exorcist is a 2005 American supernatural horror film directed by Paul Schrader and written by William Wisher Jr. and Caleb Carr. The film serves as an alternative prequel to The Exorcist (1973) and is the fifth installment in The Exorcist series. It was intended to be the official prequel to The Exorcist before it was retooled into Exorcist: The Beginning (2004), as Morgan Creek Productions executives feared the already completed film would be unsuccessful. The film stars Stellan Skarsgård, Clara Bellar, Gabriel Mann and Billy Crawford.

Dominion: Prequel to the Exorcist received a limited release in the United States on May 20, 2005, by Warner Bros. Pictures, after Exorcist: The Beginning became a financial and critical failure. The film received highly mixed reviews from critics, but was generally deemed an improvement over its earlier version.

== Plot ==
In 1944, a Nazi SS lieutenant named Kessel forces the parish priest of a small village in occupied Holland, Father Lankester Merrin, to participate in arbitrary executions in retaliation for the murder of a German trooper, in exchange for sparing the village.

In 1947, Merrin, whose faith was shattered by the incident, is an archaeologist in Derati, a remote area in the Turkana region of British Kenya excavating a Byzantine church built around the 5th century—long before Christianity had reached that region of Africa. He meets up with Father Francis, and Major Granville, the British military officer overseeing the dig. Making their way to Derati with Chuma, Merrin's translator and guide, Merrin introduces Francis to Rachel Lesno, a doctor, and Emekwi, an enthusiastic convert who provides accommodation for the two men. As they tour the dig site, Merrin and Francis notice the church is in perfect condition, as though it had been deliberately buried immediately after its construction was completed.

On the site, Merrin meets a disabled young outcast named Cheche. Despite Chuma’s objections, Merrin brings the boy to Rachel for medical treatment. Once the door is uncovered, Merrin, Francis and Chuma go inside the church. A hidden passageway leads them to a crypt containing a demonic idol—an ancient sanctuary where human sacrifice was performed. Merrin deduces that the church was expressly built to seal this underground temple. On their way back, they are confronted by local elders, who demand that Merrin stop digging.

Francis contacts Granville to send a detachment to guard the dig against potential robbers, despite Merrin's objections. Two British soldiers attempting to loot some precious stones from the church are then found dead the next day (one without his head; the other crucified to the altar head downward). Despite the Christian symbolism used in the murders and the testimony of local warrior Jomo that the two men were affected by a strange madness, Granville, blaming the Turkana, goes to town in an uncharacteristic fit of rage demanding the purported culprits be given up, shooting a young woman in cold blood when the locals protest. Determined to stop the 'Christian evil' from spreading, Jomo breaks into Father Francis' mission school and slaughters the students, including one of Emekwi's sons, before he is shot on the spot by British soldiers.

Francis has a disturbing realization that Cheche's unusual recovery is not a divinely wrought miracle as he had first thought and considers baptizing him to save his soul; the boy accepts on the condition that it be held at the church. Meanwhile, a shaken and guilt-ridden Granville commits suicide by shooting himself in the mouth. The Turkana elders demand that the church be reburied and Francis—who they hold responsible for the spread of the 'Christian evil' and the arrival of the British troops—and Cheche be handed over to them to be killed, but are turned down. Francis, assisted by Rachel, attempts to baptize Cheche at the church, but the demon inside the boy attacks them. Realizing an exorcism is in order, Francis leaves quickly to fetch his copy of the Roman Ritual. An earthquake erupts and seals the entrance to the church.

The next morning, Merrin and the British find Francis tied to a tree naked, shot with arrows. The dying Francis reveals to Merrin that Cheche is possessed and begs him to perform an exorcism. Another earthquake shifts the rocks, unblocking the church entrance just enough to allow Merrin to go inside. At the underground temple, Merrin finds Rachel—who runs away under a trance—and the possessed Cheche. After donning Francis' vestments, Merrin returns to the church to begin the exorcism. The demon offers Merrin a chance to rewrite his past, at which Merrin (in a hallucination) finds himself back in 1944 Holland: when he refuses to cooperate, Kessel instead has Merrin and all the villagers killed for his defiance.

When Merrin comes back to his senses, the demon mocks the futility of his attempt to change what happened. An aurora appears in the sky as the evil spirit's influence causes the entranced Rachel to attempt to kill herself, Emekwi to violently beat his wife, and the Turkana to charge into battle against the British. The exorcism eventually succeeds and the demon leaves Cheche's body, causing him to regress to his former condition. With the demon exorcised, life in Derati returns to normal and the British detachment leaves. One of the local elders, however, warns that the demon will pursue Merrin. Merrin bids farewell to Rachel and Cheche before leaving for Rome, having now regained his faith.

== Cast ==
- Stellan Skarsgård as Father Lankester Merrin
- Gabriel Mann as Father Francis
- Clara Bellar as Rachel Lesno
- Billy Crawford as Cheche
- Ralph Brown as Sergeant Major
- Israel Aduramo as Jomo
- Andrew French as Chuma
- Antonie Kamerling as Kessel
- Julian Wadham as Major Granville
- Eddie Osei as Emekwi
- Rick Warden as Corporal Williams
- Mary Beth Hurt as Pazuzu (uncredited)

== Production ==
Producer James G. Robinson first began development on an untitled prequel to The Exorcist (1973) in 1997, with the first draft of the screenplay penned by William Wisher Jr. In October 1999, Morgan Creek Productions hired Tom McLoughlin to helm the film. With a script finally in place, production was slated to occur the following spring in Africa. McLoughlin departed due to issues with the script. In October 2001, numerous publications reported that John Frankenheimer was on board as director, with a new screenplay revised by Caleb Carr. Liam Neeson was attached to portray the character of Father Lankester Merrin. William Peter Blatty, author of The Exorcist and screenwriter/producer of its film adaptation, was not expected to take part in the production. After a July 2003 release date was slotted, Frankenheimer was forced to step down from the project due to his declining health and was replaced by Paul Schrader. Gabriel Mann joined the cast in April 2002, while shooting was expected to take place in the spring in the United Kingdom and Spain. The following month, the film was officially titled Exorcist: The Beginning and Stellan Skarsgård and Billy Crawford were added to the cast, the former of which replacing Neeson. Principal photography on Schrader's film began on November 11, 2002 in Morocco with Vittorio Storaro handling cinematography duties. The crew spent six weeks filming in Morocco and then a further two months in Rome. By the time filming had wrapped in February 2003, six writers had contributed to the screenplay and the budget had nearly doubled.

An early cut of Schrader's film that ran at 130 minutes was shown to the studio in early 2003. The cut was widely derided due to a lack of scares and gore. The studio at first opted to re-edit the film to make it scarier, which Schrader opposed. Additional photography was then planned, which according to Schrader only grew "bigger and bigger" as time went on. Schrader attested that he faithfully adapted Carr's screenplay on screen and that the studio went through "buyer's remorse" during production. Later reports indicated that Schrader was first given the option to re-edit the film twice, with neither cut managing to satisfy the studio. Sheldon Kahn was brought in to re-cut the film without Schrader's involvement. Schrader was "livid" and reportedly demanded that Kahn leave. By then, the studio had met with other filmmakers to direct new scenes to make the film scarier. Carr was expected for rewrites, but instead the studio opted to fire Schrader and scrap the film entirely in August 2003. Morgan Creek searched for a new director starting in October. Renny Harlin was among the directors who met with Robinson and suggested to rewrite the script, cast new actors and add in more action. The studio was impressed and hired Harlin. Following revisions were done by Carr, Skip Woods, Alexi Hawley and Harlin. Skarsgård and Julian Wadham were the only cast members retained from the original shoot. In November 2003, special makeup effects artist Gary J. Tunnicliffe confirmed he would be involved with the film. Filming under Harlin's direction began in the winter of 2003 in Rome and concluded after twelve weeks.

In April 2004, Warner Home Video began to consider releasing Schrader's film direct to video. With a budget upward of $90 million, Exorcist: The Beginning opened on August 20, 2004 and underperformed at the box office and was critically panned. Schrader admitted to seeing the film on opening weekend with Blatty and told The Independent "This is really bad. If it stays this bad, I bet there's a chance I can get mine resurrected".

In September 2004, Morgan Creek began discussions with Schrader on possibly giving his version a limited theatrical release in 2005. The studio hired editor Tim Silano to assemble Schrader's version, but Silano insisted that Schrader be brought back to oversee the editing of his own material. Morgan Creek allocated $35,000 and a very short amount of time for Schrader to finish his version. The meager outlay provided by the studio to resume the film's final stage of post-production resulted in a number of compromises. Specifically, Schrader was not given enough money to conduct ADR, to bring cinematographer Vittorio Storaro back to perform the film's color timing (forcing him and Silano to approximate it themselves), nor to commission an original score for the entire film. Instead, the score was developed piecemeal, with fourteen minutes (including a central theme) being composed without payment by Angelo Badalamenti. The final twenty minutes of the film were scored by the American metal band Dog Fashion Disco (the unusual choice stemming from Schrader's son Sam's affection for the group), while the balance of the score - about an hour's worth - was recycled from Trevor Rabin's work for the Harlin version. In addition to contributing compositions, Dog Fashion Disco also "finessed" the score as a whole to give it a unity despite its disparate sources.

In March 2005, after a private screening in New York, the film was titled Paul Schrader's Exorcist: The Original Prequel. Other working titles at that time included Exorcist IV, and Dark Angel. By April, the film was officially titled Dominion.

== Release ==
Dominion: Prequel to the Exorcist received a limited theatrical release on May 20, 2005 in the United States by Warner Bros. Pictures, after Exorcist: The Beginning became a financial and critical failure.

=== Box office ===
In the United States, the film grossed $251,495.

=== Reception ===
While Blatty described Dominion as "a handsome, classy, elegant piece of work", critical reaction to the film was mixed. On review aggregator Rotten Tomatoes, Dominion: Prequel to the Exorcist holds an approval rating of 29% from 45 reviews, with an average rating of 4.7/10. The site's consensus reads "While director Schrader's attempt at a literate, internal exposition on evil temptations and human sin is admirable, this prequel suffers from hit-and-miss psychological tension, poor visual effects, and weak writing -- an overambitious failure of a horror movie.". On Metacritic, the film holds a weighted average of 55 out of 100 based on 16 reviews, indicating "mixed or average" reviews. In contrast Exorcist: The Beginning holds a rating of 11% on Rotten Tomatoes, and a score of 30 out of 100 on Metacritic.

Nonetheless, the good reviews Dominion did get were much more positive than those of Harlin's version. Roger Ebert of the Chicago Sun-Times gave it three stars out of four, and wrote that it "does something risky and daring in this time of jaded horror movies: it takes evil seriously". Leslie Felperin of Variety magazine wrote that this film is "intelligent, quietly subversive" and "Schrader has delivered a 100% Paul Schrader film, drenched in the spiritual and moral angst that's watermarked his career from Taxi Driver (as a writer) to Auto Focus (as a director)".

Owen Gleiberman of Entertainment Weekly said that "Schrader's film is a notch better than Harlin's, but when you boil out the demon feathers, it's the same damn movie". Scott Tobias of The Onion's The A.V. Club wrote that "Skarsgård [gives] a quietly mesmerizing performance", and that "Schrader's movie isn't particularly scary, but it's more substantive than The Exorcist and its sequels, because it takes demon possession out of head-spinning literalism and considers evil as something more real and commonplace".

David Edelstein of the magazine Slate said the film is "a good, thoughtful horror picture—and thiiis [sic] close to being a very good one." Brent Simon of IGN gave the film a score of 4 out of 10, saying: "The overall feeling Dominion gives off is one of rootless languor. You keep waiting for someone or something to show up and seize control of the picture, but it never really happens until the final confrontation, which feels like it might as well come from a different movie. It's not blood or gore that's missing, its context; Dominion is too polite and urbane to frighten".

Director Erik Kristopher Myers, who was the first to ever review the film in 2005, wrote: "The curious thing about the Exorcist franchise is that you have three films following the same narrative thread, but none of the chapters feel as though they belong to a greater whole. Each one plays too differently from the previous installment, destroying any sense of genuine continuity beyond names or locations. Schrader's film is the first to synthesize the elements of each one, whether intentionally or otherwise, and presents us with an Exorcist that owes as much to Friedkin as it does to Boorman and Blatty. At the same time, it also manages to achieve its own identity while still being directly linked to The Exorcist, Exorcist II: The Heretic and The Exorcist III. No other film in the series has a genuine marriage to each of its partners the way that Schrader's does".

=== Home media ===
The film was released on DVD and VHS October 25, 2005 by Warner Home Video and included deleted scenes, photo gallery, and an audio commentary by Schrader.

On October 10, 2006, the film was released with The Exorcist (and its extended cut, The Exorcist: The Version You've Never Seen), Exorcist II: The Heretic, The Exorcist III and Exorcist: The Beginning in a box set titled The Exorcist: The Complete Anthology, with a Blu-ray version releasing on September 23, 2014. It was also released in a standalone Blu-ray by Sony Pictures Home Entertainment on October 13, 2020.
