= Exorcism (disambiguation) =

Exorcism is the religious practice of evicting demons or other spiritual entities from a person believed to be possessed.

- Exorcism in Christianity
  - Minor exorcism in Christianity
  - Exorcism in the Catholic Church
  - Puritan exorcism
- Exorcism in Islam

Exorcism may also refer to:

- "Exorcism" (song) by Killing Joke
- Exorcism, a 1974 Spanish horror film starring Paul Naschy
- Exorcism: The Possession of Gail Bowers, a 2006 horror film
- The Exorcism (film), a 2024 American horror film directed by Joshua John Miller
- Exorcism (Big Love), an episode of the American TV series Big Love

== See also ==
- Exercism, an online coding platform
- Exorcist (disambiguation)
