= Gary Berntsen =

American CIA officer (born 1957)

- Born: July 23, 1957 (age 69)
- Espionage activity
- Allegiance: United States
- Agency: CIA
- Service years: 1982–2005
- Operations: Invasion of Afghanistan; Battle of Tora Bora

Gary Berntsen (born July 23, 1957) is an American former Central Intelligence Agency career officer. During his time at the agency, he served as a Station Chief three times and led several counterterrorism deployments including the United States’ response to the East Africa Embassy bombings and the September 11 attacks. He was awarded the Distinguished Intelligence Medal in 2000 and the Intelligence Star in 2004.

He later ran for the U.S. Senate in 2010 for Chuck Schumer's New York seat, but lost the Republican primary to Jay Townsend, who in turn lost the general election.

== Early life and education ==
Berntsen grew up in Smithtown, Long Island, a suburb of New York City. When he was seventeen he tried to enlist in the United States Army, but his parents refused to sign the enlistment contract. He instead joined the U.S. Air Force after turning eighteen. During his Air Force enlistment, Berntsen served for four years as a Crash Firefighter, including tours in Alaska and South Korea. After completing his enlistment in the Air Force, he became a full-time college student, graduating from the University of New Mexico with a Bachelor of Arts in Political Science and a minor in Russian Studies. He attended the U.S. Marine Corps Platoon Leader Class for two summers, but before he was commissioned in the Marine Corps, he was recruited into the CIA, joining the organization in 1982.

== CIA career ==
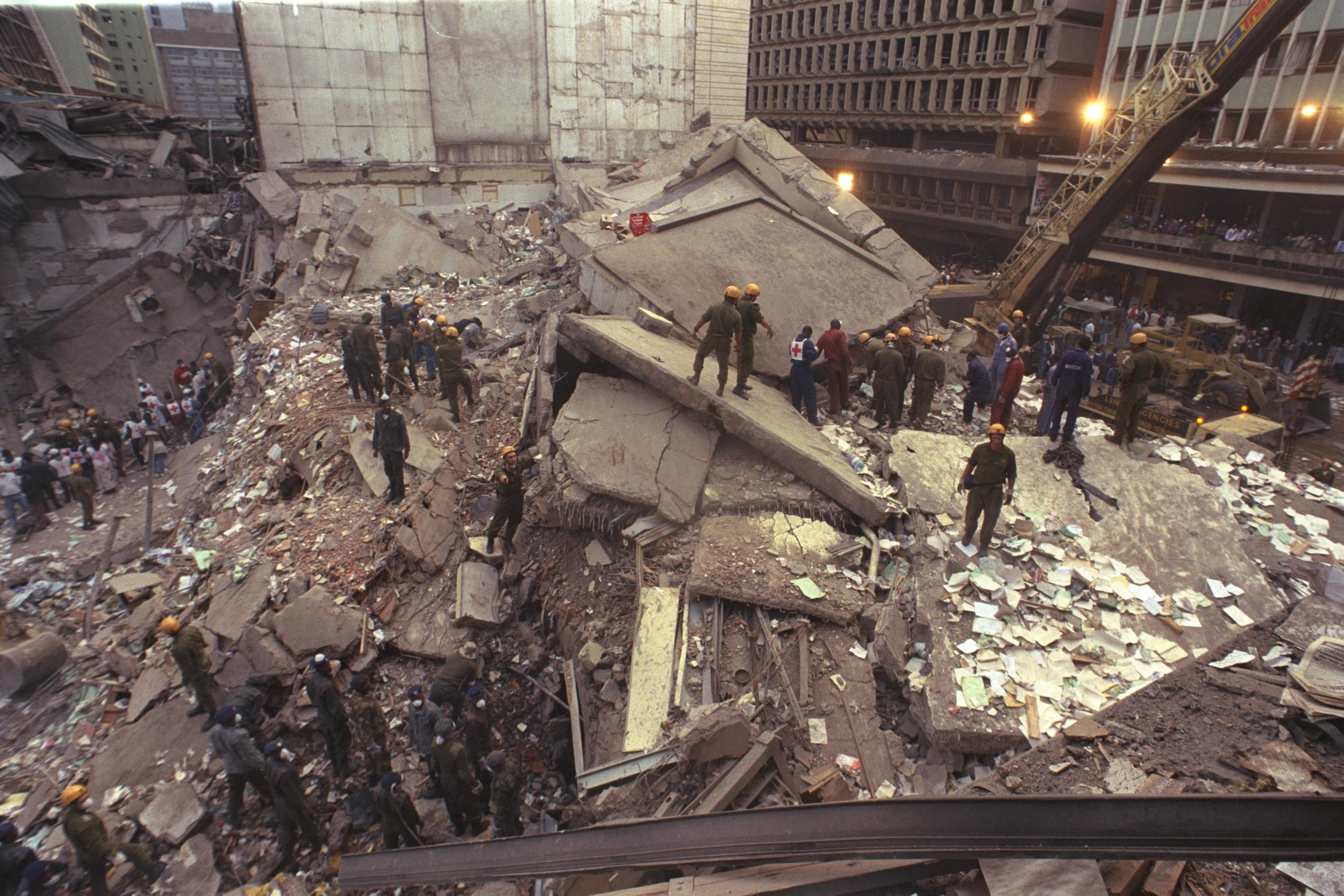
Aftermath of the 1998 bombing of the U.S. embassy in Nairobi, Kenya

Berntsen started his career in the East Asian division and soon after transferred to the Middle East division a few days after the 1983 bombing of the U.S. embassy in Beirut. He ran a group in the newly created Counterterrorist Unit starting in 1986 where he recruited informants. After the end of the Cold War, Berntsen was stationed in Kathmandu where he monitored Islamic extremists. He and his team captured multiple extremist groups from Pakistan who were attempting to smuggle weapons into India. In August 1998, Berntsen led the response team to the bombing of the U.S. Embassy in Dar es Salaam. The subsequent investigation led to the capture of around 21 people involved with the planning and execution of the attacks.

In 2000, Berntsen was recruited to serve on a mission to capture a key al-Qaeda lieutenant. He was one of the two Persian speakers on the team which was flown into the Panjshir Valley by the Northern Alliance. Soon after they arrived, there were reports that al-Qaeda's leader Osama bin Laden had known of the presence of Americans in Afghanistan and was offering a bounty for their capture. The mission was cancelled and the team was recalled by CIA headquarters, a move that Berntsen was critical of. In his book Jawbreaker, Berntsen wrote that though leaders at the CIA, particularly Cofer Black and Henry A. Crumpton, "had shown a willingness to plan and execute risky missions," top US government leadership including president Bill Clinton and CIA Director George Tenet were unprepared to take the increased risks. The mission was never executed and the CIA's indecision would lead the Northern Alliance's leader Ahmad Shah Massoud to conclude that the US was "not serious" about fighting the Taliban.

Berntsen was serving in Latin America when the attacks on September 11 happened, after which he volunteered for the Counterterrorism Units response. He joined the Northern Alliance Liaison Team, codenamed Jawbreaker, and arrived in Afghanistan a few weeks after Gary Schroen had led the team into the Panjshir Valley. Together with U.S. Special Forces and Afghan militias opposed to the Taliban and al-Qaeda, Berntsen led the Jawbreaker team. In early November 2001, Berntsen and his team entered into Kabul to secure hostages after the Taliban and al-Qaeda were pushed out. They also learned that bin Laden had retreated into the Nangarhar province, near the border with Pakistan. Berntsen sent the Jawbreaker team scout the area, aided by a local Afghan warlord they paid where they eventually tracked al-Qaeda and bin Laden hiding out in the Tora Bora mountain range. Berntsen began calling in airstrikes on the cave complex, using daisy cutter bombs, and was later joined by the Northern Alliance and the Special Forces.

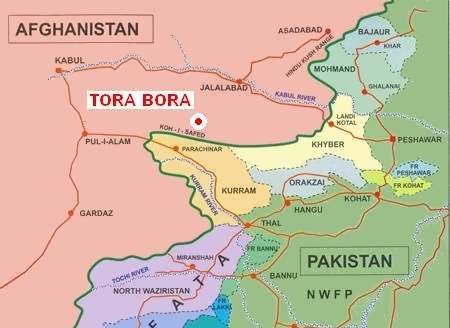
Tora Bora's proximity to the Afghanistan–Pakistan border (dark green)

After the Battle of Tora Bora began on December 1, Berntsen requested 800 Army Rangers be sent to the back of the mountain range to block off an escape route, but General Tommy Franks denied this request. On December 12, al-Qaeda called for a cease-fire with the Afghan militias in order to surrender their weapons, but which some, including Berntsen, saw as device to allow for al-Qaeda leadership, including bin Laden, to escape. When he heard of the cease-fire, Berntsen responded by screaming into his phone "No cease-fire! No negotiation! We continue airstrikes!" In early December, Berntsen was replaced as the CIA lead in Afghanistan, and sent back to his station in Latin America. He retired from the agency in June 2005.

In Jawbreaker, Berntsen alleges that bin Laden could have been captured at Tora Bora if the U.S. Central Command had devoted more resources to the operation. This claim gained substantial traction due to a Senate Report on the circumstances of bin Laden's escape. According to both Berntsen's account and the Senate Committee's report, "Bin Laden and bodyguards walked unmolested out of Tora Bora and disappeared into Pakistan's unregulated tribal area."

== Recent activities ==
Gary released his first piece of fiction in August 2008. The book is titled The Walk-In and tells the story of an American CIA case officer dealing with an Iranian defector from the Quds Force. The defector claims that a catastrophic attack is imminent and the American case officer must decide what to believe.

In November 2008, Berntsen published Human Intelligence, Counterterrorism, and National Leadership: A Practical Guide. This book was written to serve as a manual for the incoming president and White House staff and includes highly specific recommendations and policy prescriptions for human intelligence and counterterrorism operations.

Released in 2025, Berntsen was interviewed in the Netflix series American Manhunt: Osama bin Laden.

== Campaign for US Senate ==
On May 23, 2010, Berntsen officially announced his candidacy for the New York Senate Seat which was held by Chuck Schumer. On June 1, 2010, with considerable support from the New York Tea Party movement, Berntsen was named the Republican designee for US Senate against incumbent US Senator Chuck Schumer from New York and faced a Republican primary against Jay Townsend who received the Conservative party designation. After the GOP designation, Berntsen was endorsed by representative Peter King. In addition to the Republican nomination, Carl Paladino declared Berntsen his nominee for Senate on his "Taxpayers Party" line.

Jay Townsend defeated Berntsen in the September 14, 2010, primary, 55 percent to 45 percent.

== Personal life ==
Berntsen is married to Rebecca. They have two children: daughter Alexis and son Thomas. During his CIA career, the family lived in a townhouse in Reston, Virginia.

== Bibliography ==
- Berntsen, Gary & Pezzullo, Ralph. (2005). Jawbreaker: The attack on bin Laden and al-Qaeda: A personal account by the CIA's key field commander. Crown. ISBN 0-307-23740-0.
- Berntsen, Gary & Pezzullo, Ralph. (2008). The Walk-In. Crown. ISBN 978-0-307-39481-1.
- Berntsen, Gary. (2008). Human Intelligence, Counterterrorism, and National Leadership: A Practical Guide. Potomac Books Inc. ISBN 978-1-59797-254-3.
