= Clara Bellar =

French actress, singer and film director

- Born: 28 October 1972 (age 53); Paris, France
- Occupations: Actress, singer, film director, screenwriter, film producer
- Years active: 1993–present

Clara Bellar (born 28 October 1972) is a French actress, singer, film director, screenwriter and film producer.

== Filmography ==
=== Actress ===
Year	Title	Role	Notes
1993	À la mode	Rachel	
1994	Un amour aveugle		
1995	Rendezvous in Paris	Esther	
1996	Oranges amères	Angèle	
1996	Waiting Game	Eden	
1997	Hikers	Eve	
1997	David	Tamar	TV movie
1997	So This Is Romance?	Sarah	
1998	The First 9 1/2 Weeks	Emily Dubois	
1999	This Space Between Us	Zoe Goddard	
1999	Hippies	Claudette	TV series
1999	Vive le premier de mai		Short film
1999	La ballade de Do		Short film
2001	The Sleepy Time Gal	The mushroom girl	
2001	A.I. Artificial Intelligence	FemMecha Nanny	
2003	The Pharmacist	Mathilde	
2003	Kill the Poor	Annabelle	
2004	American Dreams	French photographer	TV series
2005	Dominion: Prequel to the Exorcist	Rachel Lesno	
2013	Futurestates	Nadine	TV series

=== Writer and director ===
Year	Title	Notes
2008	Watermelon Man	Short film
2014	Being and Becoming	Documentary film

== Discography ==
- My Brazilian Heart (Meu Coração Brasileiro), debut album, released on 15 November 2006.
- My French Heart, released on 28 January 2013.
