= Israel Aduramo =

English actor

- Born: Israel Aduramo Oyelumade; 28 December 1968 (age 57); Willesden, London, England
- Occupation: Actor
- Years active: 2002–present

Israel Aduramo (born Israel Aduramo Oyelumade on 28 December 1968) is an English actor.

== Career ==
Israel has a strong career in film, most prominently in Pirates of the Caribbean, The Long Firm and Dirty Pretty Things. Israel was also a lead in the Royal Shakespeare Company, and performed in David Oyelowo's play The White Devil.

== Trivia ==
He has a stage fighting certificate and speaks Yoruba language.

== Filmography ==
- The Film-Maker's Son (2012) - Ahab
- Derelict (2010) - Onesimus
- Coming Up (2006) - Samson
- Pirates of the Caribbean: Dead Man's Chest (2006) - Crippled Man
- The Bill (2006) - Mr. Tijani
- The Ghost Squad (2005) - PC Paul Bullen
- Sensitive Skin (2005) - Police Officer
- The Tiger and the Snow (2005) - Soldato americano
- New Tricks (2005) - Doctor
- Doctors (2005) - Jimmy Adler
- Dominion: Prequel to the Exorcist (2005) - Jomo
- EastEnders (2005) - Mr. Lake
- Judge John Deed (2005) - Del Peabody
- Exorcist: The Beginning (2004) - Jomo
- The Long Firm (2004) - John Ogungbe
- Casualty (2004) - Lewis Clinton
- Prime Suspect (2003) - SO19 Officer
- Pirates of the Caribbean: The Curse of the Black Pearl (2003) - Crippled Man
- The Bill (2003) - Jackson Clarke
- Dirty Pretty Things (2002) - Mini Cab Driver
- Man and Boy (2002) - Young Waiter
