= William Wisher Jr. =

American screenwriter (1955–2026)

- Born: May 23, 1955; U.S.
- Died: July 14, 2026 (aged 71)
- Occupation: Screenwriter
- Notable work: The Terminator; Terminator 2: Judgement Day

William Howard Wisher Jr. (May 23, 1955 – July 14, 2026) was an American screenwriter, known for his work with long-time friend James Cameron on the screenplays for The Terminator and Terminator 2: Judgment Day, and his work with Caleb Carr on Exorcist: The Beginning and Dominion: Prequel to the Exorcist.

== Career ==
Wisher had roles behind and in front of the camera. In the first Terminator film, Wisher has a brief role as 1L19 (real name unknown), an LAPD police officer who is incapacitated next to his own police cruiser by the Terminator, who then steals his vehicle and briefly assumes his identity on the police radio band. He also has a cameo appearance in Terminator 2: Judgment Day; here he plays a man shopping with his girlfriend and takes pictures of Arnold Schwarzenegger's T-800 Terminator getting back on his feet after being thrown through a store window. According to director James Cameron, they are the same character. He also plays news reporter Bill Tyler in Cameron's 1989 film The Abyss.

His other screenwriting work includes Judge Dredd, The 13th Warrior and both versions of The Exorcist prequel. He is an uncredited script doctor on two films in the Die Hard series, 1995's Die Hard with a Vengeance and 2007's Live Free or Die Hard (on which he also served as executive producer).

== Death ==
Wisher died on July 14, 2026, at the age of 71.

== Filmography ==
Year	Title	Credit	Other notes
1984	The Terminator	Additional Dialogue	Also co-wrote the novelization (ISBN 0-553-25317-4)
1989	Desperado: The Outlaw Wars	Teleplay	
1991	Terminator 2: Judgment Day	Written by	Co-written with James Cameron
1995	Judge Dredd	Story, Screenplay	Co-written story with Michael De Luca, co-written screenplay with Steven E. de Souza
1999	The 13th Warrior	Screenplay	Co-written with Warren Lewis
2004	Exorcist: The Beginning	Story	Co-written with Caleb Carr
2005	Dominion: Prequel to the Exorcist	Written by	Co-written with Caleb Carr
2007	Live Free or Die Hard	Executive Producer	
2016	I.T.	Screenplay, Executive Producer	Co-written screenplay with Dan Kay

Uncredited revisions

- Pumpkinhead (1988)
- A Nightmare on Elm Street 5: The Dream Child (1989)
- Judgment Night (1993)
- Die Hard with a Vengeance (1995)
- Broken Arrow (1996)
- Eraser (1996)
- Mercury Rising (1998)
- Live Free or Die Hard (2007)

=== Unmade projects ===
Year	Title and description	Ref(s)
1990s	M, a remake of the 1931 film of the same name.	
1990s	The Stars My Destination, an epic sci-fi revenge tale, based on the novella by Alfred Bester	
1990s	Valiant, a comic twist on the swashbuckling classic.	
1990s	Airframe, An adaption of the Michael Crichton novel of the same name that would've been directed by John McTiernan.	
1990s	Combat!, Based on the TV series of the same name, that Bruce Willis was in talks to star in, and was going to be produced for Paramount Pictures, with Walter Hill slated to direct.	
1990s	Superman Lives, based on the DC Comics installment in which the Man of Steel is killed by Brainiac and then comes back to life.	
1990s	A writing assignment for director Robert Zemeckis and ImageMovers at DreamWorks.	
2000s	Rainbow Six, An adaption of the Tom Clancy novel.	
2000s	An untitled project about B-24 Liberation Bombers during World War II that James Cameron was interested in directing.	
2000s	Pilgrim aka The Englishman, An adaption of Will Scully's book "Once A Pilgrim: The True Story of One Man's Courage Under Rebel Fire".	
2000s	Escape of The Pacific Clipper, A fact-based adventure about a race to get a Boeing B-314 back from New Zealand after the Attack on Pearl Harbor.	
2010s	Unproduced treatments for sequels in Terminator franchise.	
2010s	Ice Road Truckers, An action feature based on the reality show of the same name.	
2010s	Come Hell or High Water aka Samar, Based on the experiences of Captain Ernest E. Evans during the Battle off Samar, Battle of Leyte Gulf.	
2010s	Pitfall, A television pilot.	
2010s	SAD Boys, A script about the Special Activities Division of the CIA.	
2010s	An untitled project that takes place in Vietnam during the Fall of Saigon.	

==== Acting credits ====
Year	Film	Role	Notes
1977	The Reunion		Unspecified role
1978	Xenogenesis	Raj	
1984	The Terminator	1L19 (police officer)	Cameo appearance
1988	Martini Ranch: Reach		Music video
1989	The Abyss	Bill Tyler	
1991	Terminator 2: Judgment Day	Tourist/Photographer in Galleria Mall	Cameo appearance
