= Zār =

Spirit in Middle-Eastern and Horn-of-African cultures

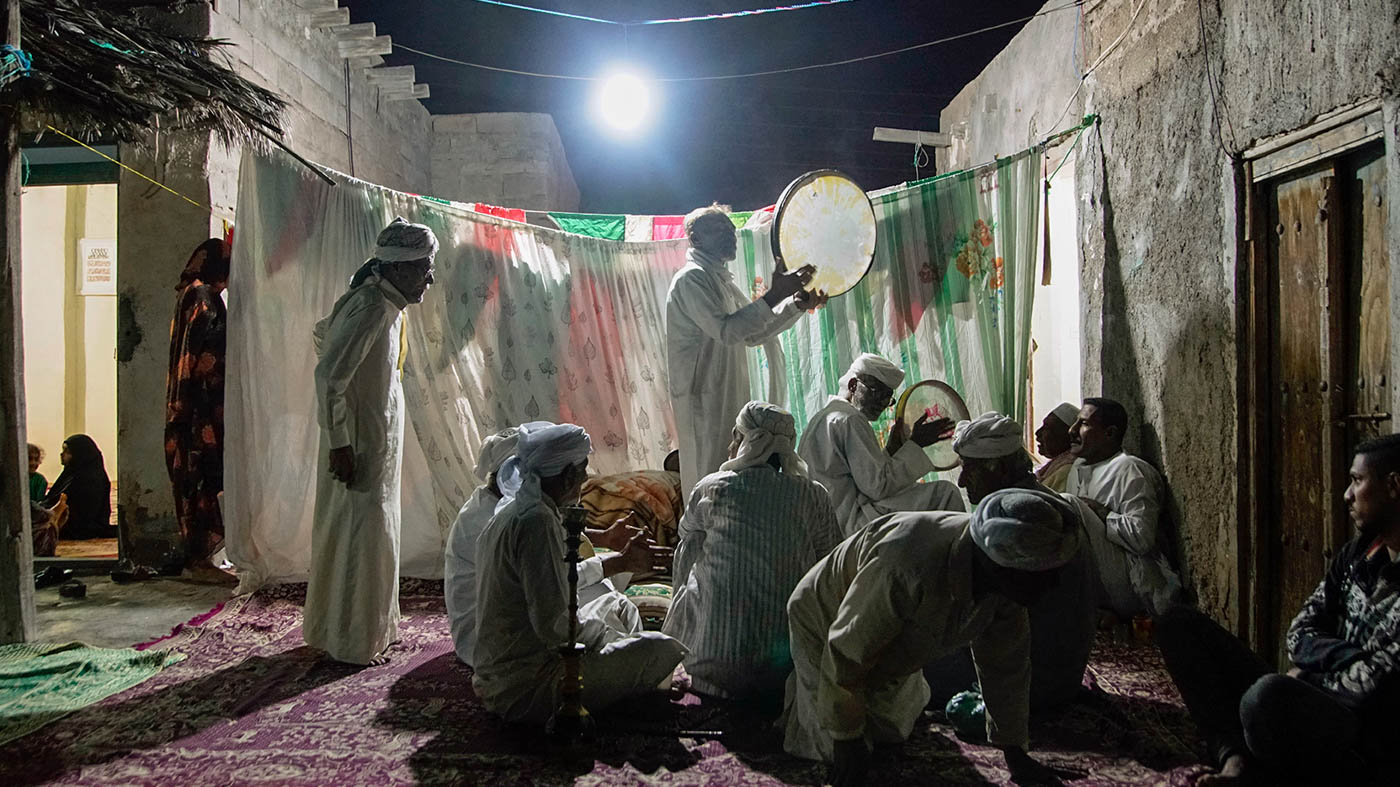
Zār ceremony on Hormuz Island

In the cultures of the Horn of Africa and adjacent regions of the Middle East, Zār (Arabic: زار, Ge'ez: ዛር) is the term for a spirit assumed to possess individuals, mostly women, and to cause discomfort or illness. The so-called zār ritual or zār cult is the practice of reconciling the possessing spirit and the possessed individual. Zār possession is often considered lifelong and the rituals associated with it are a form of adorcism, though some have falsely attributed it as an exorcism rite because it involves possession. It is similar to the Maghreb's Hamadsha, Hausa Animism, and various African Traditional religions, such as Voodou.

Zār is also a form of predominantly (not solely) women's entertainment that has become popular in the contemporary urban culture of Cairo and other major cities of the Islamic world. Participants have compared it to how those not involved in zār go to the discotheque. Zār gatherings involve food and musical performances and they culminate in ecstatic dancing, lasting between three and seven nights.

The tanbūra, a six-string bowl lyre, is often used in the gathering. Other instruments include the manjur, a leather belt sewn with many goat hooves, and various percussion instruments.

The term zār may be used to mean various different things in the places the belief is found: it may refer to the hierarchy of zār spirits, an individual spirit of this type, the ceremonies concerning these spirits, the possessed person, or the troubles caused by these spirits.

== History ==
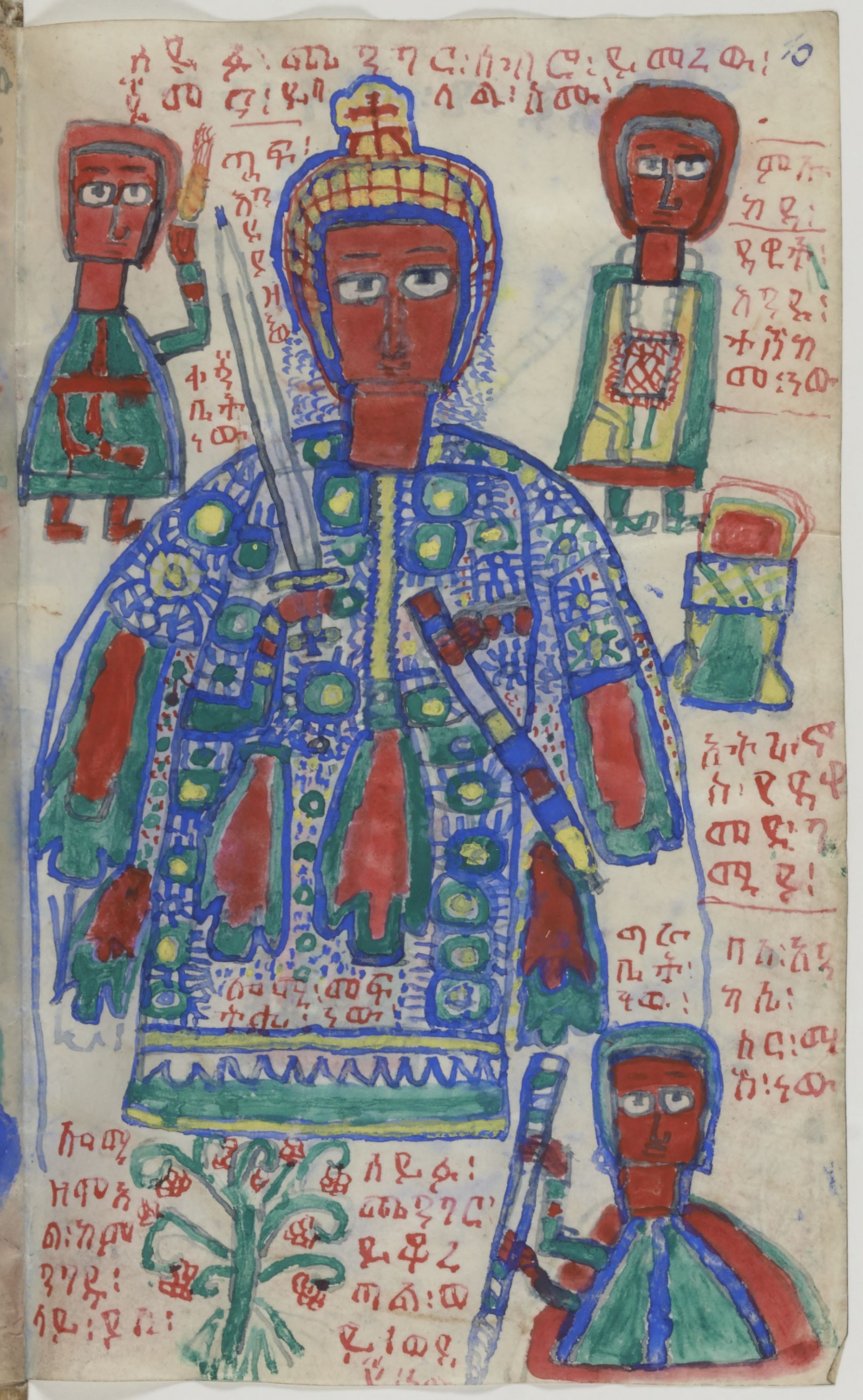
Depiction of a "king of the zār"

Scholarship in the early 20th century attributed Horn of African origin to the custom, although there were also proposals suggesting Persian or other origins. Thus, Frobenius suggested that zār and bori, a comparable cult in Hausa culture, were ultimately derived from a Persian source. Modarressi (1986) suggests a Persian etymology for the term. The first known instance of the word zār used in Ethiopia to refer to a possessing spirit is from a 16th-century Ge'ez manuscript. However, it is unknown if zār rituals were being practiced in 16th century Ethiopia (Abyssinia), and if so, what form they took. The first record of zār ceremonies is from the 1800s in Ethiopia, however by this time the ceremonies were already elaborate and being practiced in a large area, indicating these ceremonies had been practiced for sone time before recording.

Some also strongly feel the practice originated in West Africa among native religious curing practices there.

The origin of the word is unclear; Walker (1935) suggested the name of the city of Zara in northern Iran, or alternatively the Arabic root z-w-r "to visit" (for the possessing spirit "visiting" the victim). The Encyclopedia of Islam of 1934 favoured an Ethiopian origin of the word. Hager El Hadidi suggested a possible Hebrew origin from zwr (in Hebrew meaning to "turn aside, deviate, go away") or zr ("one who distances or removes himself"), owed to Jewish craftsmen in the Red Sea area. Another theory is that it derives from the name of the supreme deity of the pagan Kushites.

The practice allegedly originated in Harar, Ethiopia via Sheikh Abadir, and was introduced by Harari and Somali women to Aden in Yemen.

According to Messing (1958) the zar cult existed "in the old Muslim suburb (Addis Alam) at the bottom of the hill, now a slum even by local standards...inhabited largely by poor Amhara, half-Sudanese Muslims, and ex-slaves, who constitute most of the members of the zar cult." A late 19th-century traveler describes the Abyssinian "Sár" cultists sacrificing a hen or goat and mixing the blood with grease and butter, in the hopes of eliminating someone's sickness. The concoction was then hidden in an alley, in the belief that all who passed through the alley would take away the patient's ailment.

Mirzai Asl (2002) suggests that the introduction to Iran likewise took place in the 19th century (Qajar period) by Africans brought to Iran via the Indian ocean slave trade. Natvig (1988) reports that the zār cult "served as a refuge for women and effeminate men" in the Sahel (Sudan) region under Islamic rule. It is thought to have reached Egypt because of the trafficking of Ethiopian slaves in the 19th century, particularly Oromo women. They were taken for the purpose of bearing more children for Egyptian men, and would be set free upon getting pregnant. The children would be considered legitimate inheritors.

In certain locations, individual zār leaders may be well known, respected, and influential for generations after death. One such example is that of Sennar zār and Zainab. She was a prominent woman in Sennar zār bori and effectively its founder. She was born in Omdurman around 1880, likely to Buggi, a likely enslaved or formerly enslaved man in the military. It is also possible she was Buggi's own slave. Neither of her parents are remembered as being involved in zār. She traveled to Egypt at a young age alongside retreating Ottoman troops, and became attached to the household of Osman Murab, an Ababda agha, as a slave. Because of this Zainab was sometimes called al-Murabiyya (the Murab woman). She had a daughter while still in Egypt. In Egypt she came into contact with zār, and bori is generally understood as having come from Egypt by those in Sennar. One woman posits zār was originally Baggara, and was brought to Egypt by them and then to Sudan. Her first husband was Ababda. She later met an Egyptian soldier of Sudanese origin, and the two left Egypt. Zainab and Mursal were sent to Makwar (renamed Sennar in 1931) in the early 20th century. This was one of the colonies created to reduce the size of the army, where soldiers of enslaved and de-tribalized background were given land with suitable water sources, to farm. The women did a great deal of the farming as the men were still expected to take part in various government matters, and were only allowed to bring one wife with them, leaving their other wives scattered, necessitating travel to visit them. Zainab and Mursal had twins, but soon separated. After Mursal's death, Zainab married a man named Marajan, a nomad well known for practicing zār nugara. They had three sons together. Marajan could reportedly drink boiling water and eat burning coals because of the power he had from nugara. Zainab fell ill with zār, and upon finding it was not the kind he knew, Marajan took her to a bori practitioner. She did an apprenticeship of seven years before being inducted as bori leader, then moved in with her son Mohammed, who did nugara. Each of them learned from each other, despite practicing different zār forms. Mohammed died young after challenging a corrupt sorcerer who worked with evil spirits, and no one took up nugara after him. Zainab seems to have particularly innovated zār as an avenue for remembering and history. She also used zār to treat people, network them together, and offer entertainment and respite. Zainab died in 1960, and eventually had five successors, who in turn have produced five successors.

== Varieties ==
There are three varieties of zar in Ethiopia, though this distinction is not necessarily named by Ethiopians themselves, simply viewing the version they know as zār and not necessarily knowing of the others. "Conversion" zār is the most common, involving women and trance. It is termed as such after the "conversion hysterical reaction", not after religious conversion. Ceremonies often occur in conjunction with holidays. Seer zār is less common, and emphasizes fortune telling. Unlike the other two, it is predominantly male. Its events occur regularly throughout the year. Group therapy zār is least common, and has a leader, a zār doctor or bala Zar, helping a group of others who are possessed. It occurs regularly, but may also have special holiday events. Different regions tend to generally favor one variety over another, but in plenty of cases a region's zār will have elements from more than one type.

Somali saar has many sub-varieties, including mingis, boorane, sharax, wadaaddoo, and numbi.

In Sudan, a distinction is made (and emphasized by practitioners) between the zār bori ( or burei, or boré), practiced widely in Northern Sudan by free born women, and the comparatively more obscure zār tumbura, practiced by the descendants of slaves from South and Western Sudan and the Nuba hills, in Khartoum, poor neighborhoods, and shanty towns. Originally, tumbura had a military association. In recent times, some tumbura practitioners from the Nuba hills have selectively borrowed from bori practices, as the social circumstances for tumbura practices have changed. The practices are similar in that they use drums, Islamic praise chants for religious figures such as Muhammad, and the way possession is acted out in trance is similar.

In tumbura, it is viewed as an indigenous practice used by Non-Arab Sudanis of slave descent. The many zār groups fall under the central authority of a high male officiant, and there are male and female hierarchical lines (though recently it has become a female dominant practice due to Arabization and Islamization). The therapeutic practices occur before any public rites, and once performed the spirit becomes fully benevolent. There is only one spirit that takes many forms, and it is associated with the Self. Tumbura may refer to the spirit or the practices.

Tumbura adherents claim zār was created by Muhammad or Bilal (with the latter curing the former's grandsons and inverting the master-slave power dynamic, as tumbura adherents view Bilal as a Sudani), or both (with the former hearing the latter play his tanbūra and finding the sound so pleasing that he thought it should be used to cure the sick). Some claim the tumbura came from Arabia as a result through certain cities, and others say it came from the Red Sea area. Simultaneously to one of these origins, or another, some claim tumbura originated in the "99 peaks" of the Nuba hills.

By contrast in bori, it is seen as coming from Egypt or elsewhere and is practiced mostly by Arab Sudanis (though those of slave descent also practice it). Zār groups are independent of each other and largely female (with smaller numbers of homosexual and marginalized men among practitioners as well). The public rites are the therapeutic practice, and must be done periodically to keep peace with the spirits. There are many spirits, with different groups reporting different numbers, associated with Otherness (i.e. stereotypes and impressions of that which is not Sudanese Arab). Bori only refers to the practices, not the spirits (which are called zār).

The zār in Sudan likely has never been homogeneous, and El Hadidi emphasizes the flexible nature of zār across Africa in her own writing.

Among extant varieties of Sudanese zār cults that receive little attention are zār Sawāknī or zār Sawākiniyya (the zār from the area of Suakin, also called Dalūka), practiced mostly by the Beja. There is also the zār Nyamānyam (the zār of the Azande) which practitioners view as related to both the zār bori and zār tumbura. Rather than the tanbūra, they use the nugāra (a drum). Different origins are claimed for their zār; some say it developed after the Azande were brought north as slaves, and others say it was originally introduced by a man from the Dega tribe, who was originally from Wau. Zār Nyamānyam may sometimes be called zār nugāra.

In Sennar, bori and tumbura have become somewhat melded, mainly due to close relationships, such as marriage, between tumbura practitioners and bori practitioners, especially among local figures seen as influential. Even with this melding, there were or are multiple forms of zār in Sennar, mainly bori, tumbura, and nugāra. Zar nugāra is no longer practiced in Sennar. It has been described as "hot" and "male", like tumbura, in contrast to "cool" and "female" bori. Bori is also seen as playful while nugāra and tumbura are not. The latter two are also more secretive and considered more powerful, with nugāra having the power to kill enemies or those who trespass on the spirits. Bori and tumbura had ties to the North and Egypt as well as Sudan, but nugāra was decidedly southern. Nugāra involved southern clothes, heavy drums, much drama, and fire. It was regarded as being closely tied to sorcery and "dangerous, non-Islamic" magic. These different rites were not mutually exclusive in Sennar, and each was considered helpful for different purposes, and different members of the same family sometimes belonged to different forms of zār. There is a distinct Sennar tumbura tradition, which regards Zainab, a locally famous bori practitioner, with respect.

Other Sudanese zār cults that existed are those of the Dār Fertit ("Fertit peoples include "the Karra, Gula, Feroge, and Surro"), the Shilluk people, the Dinka people, and the dinia of the Nuba, which have all been absorbed by tumbura.

In Egypt, there were clearer divides between different zār pantheons (associated with region and race), with bands specializing in specific pantheons. This is no longer the case.

In Aden, alongside zār bori and zār tumbura, mention was made of an "Indian zar" called Gamat. It was described as a ladies' party held in the name of Al-Jilani, and distinguished from Adeni zār bori by its lack of drums.

== Spirits ==
Zār spirits are often identified with jinn or with "winds". Zār spirits may be inherited, with a spirit afflicting an older close relative going on to afflict their child or other younger relative. The plural of zār is zayrān, and adherents may use the plural to talk about 7 or more societies of spirits existing in a parallel world, and these societies generally correspond to ethnic groups and/or societies other than that of the given zār group. Philosophical pondering of zār, and the nature of zār, is not particularly common, as zār spirits are simply a part of a lived and accepted reality.

=== Egypt ===
In Egypt, there are said to be 66 zār spirits, however, the spirits named vary depending on which ritual leader one speaks to, and none will name all 66. They are loosely grouped into families, and spirits are paired together as husband/wife, brother/sister (in the Cariene Upper Egyptian zār practice, this is how all spirits are paired), or father/daughter. They are also grouped into other overlapping pantheons, such as the kings of the earth, seas, and heavens, the sultans of the red, yellow, and green jinn, and the guards of thresholds. The spirits are in a hierarchy. At the top is Mama (an Ethiopian spirit, whose name does not mean "mother"), and all the songs begin for this spirit. Spirits may be called "wilad Mama"; sons of Mama.

They are thought of as "spirit doubles" like the akran (sing. karin or karineh)- in essence, "We all have zār, only some people don't know it." Some explicitly identify the zār spirit and the karin, commonly regarded as a type of jinn, as being the same. The akran are facsimiles of their human counterpart, and in Upper Egypt are generally understood to be of the same race, sex, and temperament as the human. When the human is sick, the karin is sick. When the human dies, the karin dies- though, interestingly, tales exist of a karineh's children dying, and the spirit trying to take her human counterpart's children by killing them. In some parts of Egypt this is explained by stating that the dead child goes to its mother's karineh. However, zār spirits of either sex may possess a person- Yawra Bey is a male spirit, but he frequently possesses women. Further, if a person is possessed by one spirit, they are considered to be possessed by the other spirit they are paired with, even if they do not display symptoms of possession for the other spirit. Sometimes a person of one sex, while a spirit of the opposite sex explicitly acts through them, is referred to by the spirit's name and sex (for example, record exists of a woman possessed by "Sheikh Muhammad", who would be referred to as such when the Sheikh was called forth). Some also report that the sex or gender of the spirit may be indeterminate, calling these "hermaphrodites".

In addition to the terms zār and jinn, zār spirits may be referred to as an afrit (ghost), reeh (wind), dastour (spirit), asyad (master), or with the title Sheikh or Sheikha. The possessed person is called me'affrat, maryouh, or menzar. The primary possessing spirit may be called "the spirit of (his/her) head", or "master of (his/her) head". This spirit is identified in the girding ceremony, and its identification is necessary if one wishes to become a zār leader.

The zār spirits are said to be attracted to deserted places, dark areas, doorways, staircases, around water sources, in cemeteries, in toilets, and in garbage dumps. First experiences of possession often occur in one's teen years in a bathroom. Zār spirits are not seen as evil, though they can be vengeful- trivial offenses, such as accidentally stepping on an invisible zār spirit, often provoke the spirit to possess someone and cause illness or misfortune. In other instances, possession may occur when a person is frightened suddenly. Those who are vain, stressed, sorrowful or grieving may be more susceptible to possession.

The possessed person in Egypt is usually said to be being "worn" (Egyptian Arabic:“malbouss”) by the spirit, like a piece of clothing, however Hausa influence is evident in the zār of the Grand Lady (a series of rites specific to menopause), where the zar leader who hosts the titular spirit (or spirit in the associated pantheon) is called a horse (kodya) instead, creating a riding metaphor. The zār of the Grand Lady is unique in Egypt as it is a qualified zār leader (the kodya) who hosts the spirit during the ritual instead of the person the spirit is afflicting. In Upper Egypt the riding metaphor is also used for possession more generally, though it may refer to the possessed as camels rather than horses. In some cases the zār and the one it possesses may be that of two lovers; a story told to Winkler claims a woman's zār was sleeping with her two nights out of the week, and this caused her husband to go to court and justify only paying half the household expenses. Yawra Bey's relationship to those who possesses in particular may be described in such terms.

Each spirit is associated with specific songs, colors, sacrificial animals, and each spirit possessing a person must be placated. In addition to songs and animals (usually of a specific color or pattern), they may demand specific incense, clothes, jewelry, and candles. Christian spirits often call for consumption of alcohol, such as whisky. Different spirits are associated with different afflictions, with Ethiopian spirits being associated with aggression and nervousness. In the early 20th century in Upper Egypt, different songs were needed, but only one sacrificial animal was necessary, however, in modern Cairo, it seems each spirit gets its own sacrifices as well as its own songs. If a song displeases the zār spirit, the possessed person may not be able to remain in the room where it is being played. Once placated, the spirits may aid the possessed person in divination and providing medical aid.

In Egypt different spirits rise and fall; they are connected to different bands' specializations in different songs, and when a band ceases to exist, many of the spirits they played for will as well, with the most popular spirits and their songs being adopted into other bands. It used to be a band would be associated with a single pantheon, but this trend of fading bands and adopting of spirits has blurred these boundaries. For example, the zār 'afnu, a band made up of Black Egyptian women of slave descent, no longer exists, but many of its spirits (the Harbiya, or Liwa, pantheon) are invoked by Tambura bands and in the Grand Lady's pantheon. Yawra Bey and Rakousha belong to the Harbiya pantheon.

The spirits currently known in Egypt include Yawra Bey (who is among the most popular) and his daughter Rakousha. Yawra is a handsome dark-skinned playboy spirit, said to be an Ottoman officer, who wears a red tarboosh and sash, and possesses young women and is said to make her suitors think she is ugly, or to cause marital issues and homosexuality. He will prevent marriage until he is placated. He loves to smoke, loves perfume, and his animal sacrifices must be red. The jewelry used to placate him is usually rings set with rubies, or their glass and plastic imitations. He also likes whiskey and beer (some bring soft drinks instead due to religious prohibitions), and some zār ceremonies spill a bit of beer over the head of the person he possesses. In the Upper Egyptian tradition (Yawra being from the Sudani tradition) his equivalent was Rumi Nagdi, who was associated with green and the crescent moon and star. Rumi is also sometimes mistakenly called Rumi Magdi. His name indicates he was connected to the Ottomans and Hejaz, and Rumi was popular while Egypt controlled Sudan.

Yawra's daughter, Rakousha, is a child spirit. She is placated with pink silky clothes, luxury items, and gold jewelry. Her sacrifice is a speckled hen, and she loves candy and games, so her diviners use playing cards instead of the more usual coffee cups, prayer beads, or dream interpretations. She also likes charm or "toy" bracelets. Her Upper Egyptian counterpart was Rumi's daughter Marouma, who also likes the color green, gardens, and is offered pomegranates. Unlike Rakousha, she is an adult.

Other spirits include Gado, a Nigerian spirit associated with the bathroom (which is like a portal connecting the human and spirit worlds) and summoned by drumming. His wife is Meram or Maryouma, and their sacrificial animals are black rabbits. Light brown candles are used for them (because they wear light brown burnous). Drops of blood from the rabbits and candies are dropped into the toilet for them during their zār. Gado is the messenger between the human and spirit worlds. He and Meram cause infertility and madness, and they are provoked by hot water or human blood (specifically menstrual or hymen blood) being put in the toilet.

There is also the spirits of the pantheon of the Grand Lady, seven male (Rumi Nagdi, Hakim Basha, Yawra Bey, Rima Basha, Collita Basha, Welzami Basha, and 'Okashi Basha, all of whom also belong to the Sudani Tumbura and Upper Egyptian pantheons) and seven female (Arzuki, Shurumbella, Rora, Dawa Baba Kiri, Magaziya, the Lady Inmatan Yaro, and Folla, the only "white" female spirit). Rumi Nagdi and Hakim Basha get white sheep or chickens as sacrifices. The others get black chickens or sheep. The Grand Lady inflicts blindess, arthritis, nightmares, and paralysis on others. The rites of the Grand Lady is the most secret set of rites, and the most heavy and difficult, with its music at times being played on pillow cases.

Other spirits that have been known to Egyptian zārs are:

- Azuz, a child spirit.
- Salila, the Sudani pantheon's spirit of bathing, associated with grace and beauty. When possessed by her, one acts out bathing, combing their hair, and dances with a mirror or water jug on the head.
- Sayed El Dair, spirit of the monastery, placated with wine, wearing priest's clothes, and observing Coptic fasts and feasts.
- The Sultans mentioned before, such as El Sultan El Ahmar, who is placated by wearing a red cloak, red candles, and sacrificing red chickens.
- El Sudani, "the Sudanese", placated by wearing a green galabiya and sacrificing both a male and female turkey
- El Nabi, "the Prophet", placated by wearing a white galabiya and sacrificing a lamb or two pigeons
- Ahmed the Sudanese
- Sayyidi Amr
- Sayyedi Ahmed Zeidan
- Amir Tadrus (a Coptic spirit)
- Wullayi
- Mamah, Related to Wilad Mama, an Ethiopian spirit and sometimes the ruler of all zār spirits. "Mama" here does not refer to the idea of motherhood.
- Rumatu
- Merri, father of the Abbassi
- Sheikh El Arab
- Sayyid al Bedawi and Madbouli
- Al-Sa'iedeyya, "the Upper Egyptian woman", a female Upper Egyptian spirit placated by wearing a tulle bi telli dress and balancing a water jug on one's head
- Abu Damfa, a male Upper Egyptian spirit placated by wearing a dark-colored galabiya and dancing the naboot
- Sitt Safina, a mermaid and sister of the Sultan of the Seas, appeased by submerging one's head in a tub of water with swimming fish
- the Abyssinians, a pair appeased by wearing a silver belt and diadem with pellet bells and holding a stick with jingles as one dances
- At one point the Khedive Abbas Hilmi
- Lulubiya
- Magharba
- Muj al-Bahr
- Wullad
- Umm al-Ghulam
- In Upper Egypt "angels of the river" may feature in zār rites, with sheikhas inviting possession from those who desire incarnation. They diagnose illness, make prescriptions, and solve problems. Women throw offerings of candy, sugar, perfume, and henna into the water for them.

Additionally, occasionally people may come to ceremonies with a personal spirit who is identified as a zār spirit, but isn't known to be part of any of the existing pantheons.

=== Ethiopia ===
In Ethiopia, zār is sometimes used as a term for malevolent spirits or demons. Many Ethiopians also believe in benevolent, protective spirits, or adbar. Some believe all zār spirits are evil. Others, in distinguishing zār from the Buda and Ganyen spirits, will say the zār are not evil, but usually not good, with only a few being good and protective. Exorcism is not necessary for the zār, as it is with the other two, as one can come to an agreement with them. In any case, possession is permanent- it is not seen as possible to get the zār spirit "off (the patient's) back" once it is on. A person may also be possessed by both a zār and a Buda simultaneously. In rare cases where exorcism occurs among the "group therapy" form of zār, another spirit known to the local zār group that has no "horse" is transferred to the patient afterward. Zār spirits are thought to potentially cause psychological incapacitation. Ethiopian Jews believe that male zār cause miscarriages by having sex with married women, growing jealous of the husband, and kidnapping the fetus.

Zār are typically active at night, and not restricted to a single localized area. They may be encountered in the bush, where they are known to ride wild animals and treat them like livestock. They are most active during the nine-month dry season, and the biggest zār ceremony takes place just before the onset of Coptic lent, which coincides with the "little rains". They are more powerful and beautiful than humans, but envious of them. Some say the zār spirits have no toes and a hole in the middle of their palms. Male zār spirits are considered more dangerous by some. Most believe the zār spirits are to be avoided, but some will admit that they want to be afflicted. Satan is sometimes mentioned as their ruler.

The spirit and human worlds are parallel, so many spirits are of the same religion, ethnicity, class, and locality as other humans. They are organized into similar classes to Ethiopia, with kings, chiefs, chamberlains, and servants. They fight among themselves and the stronger, smarter zār defeat the others. The zār are curious about humans of different religions, and as such it is not uncommon for a Christian spirit to possess a Jew and make them behave like a Christian. Both doctors and patients, due to being possessed, may behave abnormally and impolitely, but are treated with tolerance, even if they cause harm.

It is commonly thought that the origin of the zār is that Eve had 30 children, and tried to hide 15 of them from God in the Garden of Eden to protect them from God's envy. God knew she had done this, and declared they should remain invisible forever, and those 15 became the ancestors of the zār spirits. These 15 are often described as being the more beautiful and intelligent half of her children, and this is used to explain why zār spirits in Ethiopia are more likely to possess beautiful women in some areas. A variation on the story of how zār spirits came to be is that the Virgin Mary, rather than God, asked to see Adam and Eve's children, and cursed the hidden ones. It is also said by some that a zār spirit taught humans how to make fire and cook.

The different spirits are associated with different symptoms, have different variations in dance, and have their own "war chants" (fukkara).

Belief in such spirits is widespread among both Christians and Muslims. Ĥēṭ ("thread") is a term of for the possessing spirits.

According to legend, there are eighty-eight "Sároch", invisible spirits that serve as emissaries of evil all under the service of a spirit named "Wárobal Máma", king of the spirits, who dwells in Lake Alobar in the Menz region. His drum is heard over the water as an omen whenever war, famine, or pestilence approach. However, some Ethiopians believe the zār originally come from the area around Lake Ashenge and its eastern lowlands.

Vulnerability to possession is often transferred from mother to daughter, and may be done deliberately via promises made by the mother to the spirit if the spirit has become a powerful protector (a weqabi). Part of the goal of negotiations with the spirits is to turn them into weqabi. People who are melancholy, alcoholics, or have weak personalities are also susceptible. They may also possess those who are beautiful or have good voices. Adults who sleep alone are also vulnerable to possession, as zār possession itself is likened to sexual intercourse between the spirit and human. Zār spirits are also drawn to afflict those who sing or play the flute alone, in a cave alone, or sitting alone under a tree by a river. They may also possess spectators of zār events who dare to laugh.

The zār spirits are thought to grant power to adherents; the power to heal, but also courage, divination, diplomacy, and the power to destroy the disrespectful.

Zār beliefs are common today even among Ethiopian immigrants to North America, Europe, or Israel. For example, Beta Israel are often raised with both Jewish and Zār beliefs, and individuals who believe they house a spirit are bound to attend to it despite other demands. However, ceremonies can be performed by shamans to persuade a spirit to leave, thus releasing the person from their duties to that spirit.

=== Iran ===
In southern Iran, including Baluchistan, zār is interpreted as a "harmful wind" assumed to cause discomfort or illness. Types of such winds include Maturi, Šayḵ Šangar, Dingemāru, Omagāre, Bumaryom, Pepe, Bābur, Bibi, Namrud. In Baluchistan, the spirits are called Gowat ("wind"), bad (also "wind"), jinn (jinn-e zār), or zār, and are considered contagious. Possession is permanent, and the zār is not as strongly associated with women, and is instead more associated with the poor in general. Some state that the rich will never need to worry about zār possession. The spirits are said to prefer the young and strong, though they will afflict the old and weak as well. They are also attracted to people with melancholy and weak personalities.

Those who have been possessed and done a zār before are called Ahl-e-Hava (Eve's family), or "People of the Air/Wind", and must attend every zār. If the spirit asked for something like clothes to be placated, those must be worn to future zār ceremonies, and nothing the spirit asked for may be sold. The Ahl-e-Hava must always wear clean, white clothes, abstain from alcohol, not touch dead bodies (human or animal), not commit adultery, not do anything illegal, wear perfume, bathe often, among other prohibitions, or else the spirit possessing them will cause them trouble.

The spirits are described as "mounting" the people they possess, treating them like horses. They have names, are associated with specific colors, are said to be of specific religions (Muslim, Jewish, Christian, or "infidel") and national origins, and there are unique ways to deal with them. The "infidel" spirits are considered more dangerous, and may kill the person they possess, while Muslim spirits rarely do so. The possessed person may be called markab (mount) or faras (horse), and the spirit may be called habub or pehpeh.

Some divide the winds into "winds that can see" (bina) and "blind winds" (bad-i kur). Bina know everything about the whole world, and will answer questions if asked. Bina have had offering ceremonies and votive meals (sufra), drunk blood, heard and been honored by poetry and songs. They are also called "clear/pure winds" (bad-i saf) and are said to never disturb the people they possess. The "blind winds", by contrast, are never calm or "clear", and bother the people they possess. They have never been honored as the bina have, and the rituals effectively transform these "blind spirits" into "spirits that can see".

Locally, spirits referred to as zār are "infidels", and are also called "red winds" (bad-i surkh), and come from Zanzibar, Somalia, Ethiopia, Saudi Arabia, and India, the former three being considered more dangerous. They can be identified by what language they speak, and will do so after drinking blood, but only to the zār leader (Bābā or Māmā). There are over 72 different zār, with corresponding ailments. Nuban are spirits that make those that possess sad, handicapped, and infirm. Mashayikh are Muslim spirits, "pure" (pak), and settled on Muslim coasts. Bad-i jinn live on or under the Earth, are interconnected, and dangerous. Bad-i pari (fairies) are further divided into Muslim and "infidel" fairies. Bad-i div/dib (devils) are over 40 meters tall, live in deserts or islands, and if they touch a human, they will turn into a statue and die. Bad-i qul (ogres) look like drunks from afar, and may try to kill en-masse. A specific spirit called Maturi is known for asking for golden items.

The 2012 film The African-Baluchi Trance Dance depicts a variety of zar-related activities in southeastern Iran.

Iranian Australian photographer Hoda Afshar's book Speak the Wind (2021), which includes an essay by anthropologist Michael Taussig, contains many photographs of the people of the islands of Qeshm, Hormuz, and Hengam in the Strait of Hormuz, which were used in the Indian Ocean slave trade. Some of her photographs illustrate their belief in the zār, as a harmful spirit-wind that possesses people's bodies. One reviewer sees her images as a metaphor for "possession of land and of bodies in the real world, and of the transgenerational trauma that possession constructs".

=== Oman ===
In Oman, the state of possession is often inherited, and possession is contagious. If a person resists possession, it is said to cause the spirit to worsen their affliction. Possession afflicts those who mock the zār spirits at ceremonies, those with weak and pensive personalities, those who are enviable, those unmarried over a certain age, and those unmarried who sleep alone.

The possessed may lack enthusiasm, refusing to eat or work. The possession itself may be compared to intercourse; nocturnal emissions are taken as evidence that one is possessed, and when men have convulsive seizures, it is thought of as the zār spirit orgasming. Talking to oneself is also evidence of zār. Different zayrān will speak in different tones. As is usual, a single person can be possessed by many zayrān. Exorcism is possible in Omani zār (unusual compared to other practices), but if it cannot be done, the spirit is kept "tamed".

Zār spirits are considered a type of jinn or ifrit. Their origin story in Oman is similar to the story told in Ethiopia; 15 beautiful children, who were hidden and turned into spirits. These 15 are "children of the night", and the zār spirits are their offspring. They have powers humans don't and are active only at night. They are jealous of humans, though humans are weaker and uglier, because they come from Eve's 15 other children, the "children of the day".

Spirits often bear the name Saif (male) or Maryam (female). They take control of the body to interact with others, and their personality and behaviors dominate.

=== Somalia ===
In Somalia, the spirits are called saar, or sometimes mingis. Different spirits have different practices (such as different types of incense, dance, music, and animal sacrifices), associated with them in rituals, which vary between different groups. People of all classes participate in saar, though adherents say different spirits tend to attack the poor and rich, and Somali men feel the practice is more common among wealthy women.

Saar spirits may be inherited. They may also take advantage of a person experiencing a strong emotion (such as anger) to enter them. Belongings of a possessed person may also transmit the spirit to others. Women, and less commonly men, sometimes go into trance at weddings during dances, and saar songs may be performed to figure out which spirit caused it and to treat the possessed.

Symptoms of possession include fear, anxiety, general malaise, unhappiness, sleeplessness, tiredness, feebleness, lassitude, mental confusion, nausea, fainting, persistent headache, unwillingness to eat or speak, loss of weight, vomiting, ‘madness’, feeling pressure in the chest, unspecified aches in muscles and bones, fertility problems, violent bodily agitation, blindness or paralysis without apparent organic cause and epilepsy.

When the possessed does not attend to their saar spirit, such as by burning incense, the spirit is angered.

=== Sudan ===
The names for the spirits vary slightly depending on which variety of the zār it is. The zār bori uses the terms zār, reeh, dastūr (which in northern Sudan refers to a door jamb or bolt in addition to the more conventional meanings of permission), rowhān, and reeh, al-ahmar, while the zār tumbura uses tumbura, reeh al-ahmar (red wind), reeh, and dastūr. In zār bori, there are three types of jinn: white (good, always Muslim, may do work for holy men, do not inflict severe behavior in possession), black (malevolent, always pagan, cause severe illness or death), and red (neither good or bad, capricious and amoral, cause mild illness). Zār spirits are of the last type, though men tend to blur the line between red and black jinn, seeing the former as malevolent. By contrast in tumbura the "red wind" is ultimately viewed positively.

As before mentioned, the bori practice believes there are many spirits, while the tumbura believes in one spirit with different presentations, called khayt (threads). The Nyamānyam adherents also believe in many spirits.

The tumbura spirit, once placated, is identified with the Sufi sheikh 'Abd al-Qadir al-Jilani. After placation it does not cause the person illness again, and in fact is generally beneficial to tumbura devotees, as long as they have an active relationship to the spirit. This is similar to the blessing (baraka) a Muslim saint bestows upon those who follow him in a Sufi order. As a result, less emphasis is placed on the demands of the spirit in tumbura than in bori. What the spirit wants most is the person's initiation into tumbura. It has other demands (talabāt), but these are specific and inexpensive, usually consisting of clothes for the khayt's costume. However, if a person abruptly withdraws from tumbura, this is considered deeply offensive by the group, and the spirit withdraws its blessing, which can lead to misfortune and illness. However it does not directly cause these, so tumbura cannot treat them, though one can return to the cult and regain the spirit's blessings. Usually an attempt to withdraw is punished with a fine.

Those who are affiliated with tumbura may find they are possessed by spirits from other traditions, such as bori, but will seek treatment through tumbura rather than other practices.

Different tumbura spirit manifestations or "modalities" are associated with different days, and like in bori, have different associated costumes, mannerisms, personalities, songs, and incense, which are stereotypes (specifically, cultural and historical memories that transcend time and space through possession) of various ethnicities and religions, though there is no Arab khayt. Khayts can essentially represent a form of ancestral veneration, as several represent the cultures tumbura adherents belonged to before slavery, and certain khayts are associated with the souls of specific dead people (leading to their songs no longer being performed). One may refer to a khayt not only with their name, but also the names of characters in the songs associated with them (such as Babīnga and Grindī (a hippo) to refer to Banda).

Khayts are summoned ("brought down", which also refers to the formalization of a khayt) by the sanjak playing specific songs. The khayt are pictured as crawling upon a person's back and into their head. Khayt are considered eternal, and existed before they were "brought down" with a jawab. Information about the khayts mostly comes from songs called jawabs (meaning letter, message, or answer). When sanjaks no longer remember a jawab or lack the power to use it, the khayt still exists, but cannot be contacted. Jawabs likely record parts of Non-Arab Muslim Sudani history.

In tumbura, some of the different presentations of the spirit are named as:

• Khawājāt/Khawājā, found in both tumbura and bori. This spirit represents white Christian foreigners. The costume is a pith helmet, khaki shorts, fly whisk, pipe, and sunglasses. This khayt has its own cult banner, which is black, blue, or white, with a white or black cross. Khawājāt (as well as Bāshawāt) is viewed positively because the English, in particular, fought the Mahdists, and during that time many non-Arab Muslims fought alongside them. Additionally, there is nostalgia among some non-Arab Muslims in Sudan for the colonial era as Arab-led governments have worsened their standard of living, and have attacked tumbura (as well as zār overall).

• Azraq Banda, found in both tumbura and bori.

• Habashī, a spirit once generally belonging only to bori. This spirit represents Ethiopians.

• Nuba, which represents an originally pagan tribe before it was targeted by slavery and Islamization, part of the history of non-Arab Sudani Muslims. The worst plunders they experienced under the Mahdists are recorded in tumbura songs. They were conscripted into armies, and even before slavery, many were warriors. As such this khayt has a fierce or violent character. Its costume is a straw loincloth and a spear. Elements of its character are used for spirits representing Southern tribes in bori, but the Nuba itself does not appear.

• Banda/Bandawī who is associated with Saturday. This modality represents an originally pagan tribe, presented in the cult as Black cannibals from far south who are warriors with a hundred sharp teeth, before it was targeted by slavery and Islamization, part of the history of non-Arab Sudani Muslims. It is not entirely unclear which tribe or tribes this spirit refers to as there is a Banda tribe (which was subjected to slave raids and harsh rule during the 1880s on, recruited as soldiers, and known for maintaining pagan practices even after conversion), but the spirit has been identified by cult members with the Azande. Banda does not seem to appear in bori. Banda's costume involves dressing in black with a straw loincloth, a spear, and beaded leather fillet, with looped fringes at the temples of red, yellow, white, and blue beads reaching the shoulders, and cowrie shells arranged in cross shapes on it as well. More beads and cowries are worn crossing over the chest and back. Sometimes anklets of bells or bottle caps were worn, and sometimes the face was smeared with white ashes. The Banda khayt has their own cult banner, black with their name embroidered in white. Banda is associated with snakes, and it is said that his snake comes from Mount Karūr (in the south of Azande land) and would appear during the therapy of patients he possessed. The Azande are stereotyped as cannibals, with teeth filing being seen as "evidence" of the practice, but this is a stereotype based on ideology.

• Gumuz, which represents an originally pagan tribe before it was targeted by slavery and Islamization, part of the history of non-Arab Sudani Muslims. Like the Banda, it is possibly referring to the tribe of the same name, the Gumuz, who suffered under slavery in the 1870s and 80s, though cult members deny this and say it refers to Black "dwarfs" that live near the Nile. The representation of this khayt is less concete and standardized than the Nuba or Banda.

• Tumburāni, a European Christian khayt. He is an archetype of Khawājā, and no one goes into trance during his song. His song is the most important song of the tumbura, and people stand up and rejoice when it is performed.

• Sawākiniyya, considered to be one of the two most ancient khayt, brought down in the Turco-Egyptian period. It is named after the city of Sawakin. This khayt lacks a specific personality or costume, and does not appear in bori.

• Lambūnāt, considered to be one of the two most ancient khayt, brought down in the Turco-Egyptian period. The name refers to female slaves from Sawakin. It has been identified with representing Ethiopians, but this seems tenuous at best, and cult members do not agree with this conclusion. This khayt lacks a specific personality or costume, and does not appear in bori.

• Bābūrāt, whose name means "ships", specifically those that brought Europeans- the Anglo-Egyptian army- to Sudan. This khayt is very old and has few that are possessed by it.

• Bāshawāt's name comes from the title basha, and he represents an Anglo-Egyptian soldier who fought against the Mahdists, who represented the interests of the Sudanese Arab slave owners, and as such, is viewed positively by tumbura (in comparison to Turco-Egyptian soldiers). In bori, Bāshawāt is viewed as malevolent. This khayt's costume includes a red fez.

• 'Abd al-Qadir al-Jilanī, who has his own cult banner, in white and blue.

• Bilal, who has his own cult banner, which is red with a white star and crescent, with his name embroidered in black. He does not appear to possess people, and no acts are performed in his name. He has one song performed at the end of ceremonies before one dedicated to al-Jilanī. His role is still important, uniting Islam and Arabness with the non-Arab Black Sudani identity without negating the difference between them.

Bori spirits are particularly attracted to married women between 35 and 55, because of their fertility, and covet women who use henna, soap, perfume, and scented oil, and wear gold, and diaphanous toubs, because the spirits themselves covet those things. Men's public participation in zār bori is fairly uncommon, though in private, some men who aren't publicly involved will admit they believe they are possessed by bori spirits and that they believe in or admire the zār bori practice. Similarly, unwed women may affirm they are possessed, but typically do not publicly or officially acknowledge it, as there is an impropriety to a woman whose fertility isn't activated (via loss of virginity) being possessed. This is one of many ways zār bori draws similarity between zār spirits and husbands. It is also less likely a zār spirit will bother a virgin as it cannot effectively threaten her fertility to obtain what it wants. Zār spirits, and a likelihood to become possessed by zayrān generally, also tend to run in families along the maternal line, though they are not really considered inherited.

Bori spirits are commonly figures such as Darāwīsh (Holy men and women), foreign spirits (Khawājāt, which includes Europeans, North Americans, Hindus, and Chinese spirits), desert nomads ('Arāb), Syrians/Domari (Halib, not found in tumbura), Ethiopian prostitutes (Habashī, only recently and uncommonly found in tumbura), Ottoman and European officials (Bashawāt), West Africans (Fallatas, not found in tumbura, who as a group also include West Sudani spirits), and spirits from the South who are often prostitutes, servants, and cannibal sorcerers. This last is a stereotype from Arab culture that was applied primarily for ideological reasons against African pagans. Though zār bori spirits represent that which is "Other", a person may be possessed by a spirit from the same tribe or ethnicity as them. When female zār spirits appear, they appear as idealized versions of the woman they possess, regardless of the spirit's own ethnicity. While women may be possessed by either male or female spirits, in Hofriyati zār bori practice, men are only possessed by male spirits, though this does not hold true in Khartoum and Omdurman for gay male participants.

Zār bori spirits are seen as inhabiting the natural, physical world but are normally invisible, but when they take human form, they always have animal feet, particularly that of a camel or donkey. They are capricious, amoral, ambivalent, and not fully understood by adherents. They may possess different aspects of their personality in different people that they possess. They are made of smokeless fire and wind, can fly long distances quickly, live for a long time but are ultimately mortal, age from children to elderly, marry, and have children and homelands. Zār spirits, like jinn overall, frequent the desert, abandoned houses, and rubbish heaps, especially at night, or at sunrise or sunset. They are more likely to invade in areas and times of ambiguity, ambivalence, disorder, and when defenses are down. They also stay near ("above") those they possess.

Possession, especially by more malicious spirits, is more likely to occur in these areas. It is less likely to occur while on the village paths, and even less likely while in the enclosed female quarters of the home. Women are at increased risk of possession (from jinn overall as well as zayrān and river sprites) during times when they experience blood loss from the genitals, which is itself more likely to occur during or after childbirth, circumcision, or defloration. Excessive blood loss at this time is also caused by spirits. Possession in this instance will lead to fertility issues. Gold jewelry can help alleviate or prevent such dangers, particularly the khatim ginay masri, a ring made from an Egyptian guinea coin. However, spirits will still hover around a woman and her gold jewelry, so if she comes near a woman who is not wearing any gold, that woman is at risk of illnesses caused by spirits and of possession. The odors of sweat and blood may also make a woman susceptible to possession and illness, and "sweet" incense is used to dispel jinn from areas. If a woman experiences zār affliction during pregnancy, the child may be born possessed. This may also occur during breastfeeding. The onset of possession is not necessarily signaled by trance.

Zār spirits cause various ailments, such as anxiety, depression, fertility issues, and hallucinations, but for bori adherents, the idea that a zār would cause these in extremity or kill the person they possess is illogical, as it would make it difficult or impossible for the zār spirit's desires to be fulfilled. They want the person they possess to take care of themselves, and may cause them trouble if they do not. Severe ailments are either natural in origin, the work of sorcery, the evil eye, or more violent spirits and demons. Though zār spirits aren't the cause, they can worsen the situation. However, some do speak of zār spirits taking infant children (resulting in death).

Zār bori spirits may cause those they possess to drink straight cologne, smoke, dance wantonly, flail about, burp, hiccup, drink blood and/or alcohol, wear men's clothes, threaten men with swords, or speak loudly and offensively. They may confer knowledge to those they possess, such as the ability to play an instrument associated with the zār spirit's ethnicity, or skills in poetry and story-telling.

Possession trance (ghaybiya) is conceived of as the spirit entering the body and displacing the possessed person, though adherents also insist the possessed is still present. A person and the spirits may both speak during an incident, and a person maybe referred, and refer to themselves, in plural to include the spirit as an aspect of their physicality, even outside of trance. A rigid distinction is not drawn between the human and the zār spirit, including in trance, and one or the other or both may bear responsibility for certain behaviors. Possession trance is a learned behavior to facilitate a relationship with one's zār spirits, as well as a way of channeling and controlling their inclinations (such as a spirit's aggression) so it is expressed without causing harm, and so the behavior makes sense to other zār adherents. Over time, one becomes more skilled at switching between different states of consciousness, which is framed as not resisting the entry of the zār spirits. As such, spontaneous trance, outside of ceremonies, is associated with long-term zār bori adherents. It is inappropriate for those menstruating to go into possession trance, and women will signify this to their spirits by tying a knot in their braids. Men in possession trance typically sit calmly, especially if possessed by holy man spirits.

Possession is acted out at ceremonies by dressing in a manner associated with the spirit, adopting stereotyped gestures and behaviors, and dancing in response to specific music or incense. The zār afflicts a person, cannot be exorcised, and makes demands. The period of placation once these are fulfilled is referred to as the spirit "sleeping", naturally implying the reoccurrence of symptoms that occur in bori but not tumbura when the spirit "wakes". This may also be called a spirit "burning". After this dancing, those who were possessed may scratch at themselves and hiccup or burp, signifying the spirit's dormancy.

The songs in zār bori are called khayt (pl. khuyut). The songs and ceremonies are an invitation for the spirit to cause possession trance, and if this invitation isn't extended frequently, it can aggravate the spirits and cause them to cause trance without invitation. To enter the human world via possession is their primary motive, so creating opportunities for the spirits to do so is a fulfillment of the agreement between the human and their zār spirits. This agreement is constantly renegotiated, both in potential relapse due to the human's failure to uphold it, and in gradual ideal symbiosis. Relapses in zār affliction can also be caused by mourning, strong emotions, and exposure to foul and unclean things.

The spirits found in zār bori include:

- 'Abdalgadir al-Jaylani, a Dervish spirit who is the counterpart of a popular Baghdadi holy man and is known to both cause and heal fertility issues. This identification to a real human figure is the same as the Al-Jilanī central in zār tumbura.
- Sitti Khudara (the "Green Lady"), daughter of a Holy Man zār. She is associated with bitter incense (called bakhur tayman, “incense of the twins,” or dowa, “medicine.”), Evening in Paris cologne, and the color green. She is pious, beautiful, and graceful. She is specifically the daughter of al-Jaylani, and married to Birono, and Ethiopian Christian spirit, though she herself is Muslim. This marriage means she's sometimes classified among the Ethiopian spirits herself.
- Shaykh Mohammed, a holy man/Dervish spirit who belongs to the Qadriya fraternity, which is popular in Sudan. He is associated with the Khatmiya brotherhood, and its founder, Mohammed Osman al-Mirghani.
- Saida Zaineb is Shaykh Mohammed's daughter, based on his real-life Sudanese great-granddaughter. Her khayt attributes a degree of political power to her.
- Sayidi Bedawi (Our Lord Bedawi), the zār counterpart of Sayid Ahmed al-Bedawi, whose shrine is in Tanta, Egypt. He is also associated with women's fertility.
- Bedawiya is Bedawi's daughter, and has similar associations with grace, piousness, and beauty to Sitt Khudara.
- Shaykh Hamid, the zār counterpart of Hamid Abu 'Asa.
- Other holy men and women (who themselves are usually daughters of holy men, and inherit their baraka) spirits, who have their host act in a serene and dignified manner while in possession trance. Of all the zār bori spirit groups, they are one of two likely to possess men outside of the circumstance of possession transferred during pregnancy. They are most commonly associated with the color white, and will often ask for a white ram as sacrifice. They ask for white or green dresses, jalabiyas, white skullcaps, white turbans, white prayer shawls, and forked walking sticks (typical of wandering religious scholars).
- Lulīya, or Lulīya Habishīya, an Ethiopian prostitute spirit who likes weddings and is known in Hofriyat to imitate the mannerisms associated with local virgin brides. She may also take over a person's body during events associated with weddings but not intended to call upon zār. She may ask for, or be associated with, garments such as a red and white toub, transparent toubs, and short dresses. She also demands wedding incense, agate beads, a gold nose plug, silver earrings, and a silk firka garmosīs- all bridal wear.
- The Banāt Jozay, at-Tomat Rongay (Paired Girls, Splendid Twins) are twin female Ethiopian spirits, associated with potent fertility that has produced inappropriate results.
- Sulayman, Ya Janna (Sulayman, O Veiled One) is a gay male spirit from the Sudan-Ethiopia border whose name has a pun: janā (fruit) can refer to offspring. He may be classed among both the Ethiopian and desert Nomad spirits. He makes his host chew tobacco, drink marisa beer, and wear a jalabiya, which he fusses with like it is a woman's tob.
- Romani, Ya Wazir Galla (Roman, Vizier of the Galla) a spirit representing Italian presence in Ethiopia before World War Two.
- Mohammed Sa'dabi, a spirit of the Sa'dab tribe to which Mek Nimir belonged, and some of whom fled to Ethiopia in 1822 after the death of Ismail Pasha.
- Dodo, Ya Jabal Nado (Dodo, O/you Mount Nado), a spirit of a mountain where coffee is grown. He asks for coffee to drink.
- Dodo, Sitt aj-Jabana (Dodo, Lady of the Coffee) is a female spirit who also demands coffee and a gold Ethiopian crucifix for her hosts to wear on Sunday.
- Wilād Mama, an Ethiopian spirit (or spirits- it is often addressed in plural) and the vizier of all zār spirits. It must be summoned first, to usher in the other spirits. It is a spokesman, and receives sacrificial blood on the behalf of other spirits. Many zār bori shaykhas are possessed by it. This spirit is typically referred to as male, but the behaviors associated with it (such as nursing a baby) are feminine.
- Maray, a beautiful Ethiopian prostitute or salacious noblewoman.
- Birono, an Ethiopian king who has been recorded as demanding an ebony walking stick. He is Christian, and married to Sitt Khudara.
- Shamharush, a petty prince.
- Yo, a court official.
- Bishir Tadir, a dark-skinned nobleman.
- Sultan al-Habish, the king of Ethiopia who wears red and rides a horse. He is probably based on Haile Selassie.
- Galay Galay, a chief of the Galla tribe. He commands the people he possesses to hold a spear.
- Sultan ar-Rih or Sultan al-Ahmar (Sultan of the Wind or the Red Sultan), who is figured as the kind of the zār spirits. He isn't common in areas like Hofriyat, and seems to have been supplanted by Wilād Mama in that case.
- Sultan Mara'iy, Sultan of the grazing land.
- 'Owdalay, an Ethiopian servant.
- Amelio, an Italian amir or count.
- Habishi Nakhadar
- Hamama-t-al-Bahr (Pigeon of the River) is beautiful like a water bird, and her hosts act out swimming through a river or do the Hofriyati pigeon dance in that locale. Her khayt is often drummed out of order, near the Crocodile spirit, at-Tumsah.
- Sitt am-Mandil (Lady of the Handkerchief), who is flirtatious.
- Other Ethiopian spirits, who as a class are associated with fertility issues, and the color red (which is also the color of blood, which is linked to fertility). As such they demand red clothes and red sacrificial animals. Male spirits of this class are associated with political power and heritable authority, and dance in a proud and stately manner. They typically demand red fezes, shawls, jalabiyas, and occasionally walking sticks of ebony or ivory. Female spirits dance salaciously, smoke, drink alcohol, love and use perfume to the point of drinking it, and demand red dresses and headscarves of the Ethiopian style. Spirits of this class are often Christian.
- Sitt agh Ghwayshat (The Lady of the Bracelets), an Egyptian who has been recorded as preventing people she possesses from eating until they obtain certain foods (apples, cherries, fish, sausages, and figs).
- Gasīs Romay, a Catholic priest, whose possessed act out benedictions and sword fights.
- Dodomayo, a Greek spirit who often acts intoxicated and selects women from the crowd as a wife.
- Dondo Ya Rundu, a wealthy Westerner. He smokes Benson and Hedges, drinks whiskey, and spends his time reclining in bed or riding in taxis.
- Mistayr Brinso (Mister Prince), a Khawājā archeologist. He asks for a pith helmet, khakis, socks, black shoes, and glasses.
- Abu Rīsh, Ya Amir ad-Daysh, a Khawājā spirit that represents a British Pasha. Those possessed may goose step, salute, shake hands in the Western style, and mime holding swords.
- Daidan, who asks for a good mattress.
- Sitt Mama (Lady Mother), a Coptic Egyptian woman who enjoys eating pigeons and has her hosts cap their incisors in gold.
- Dona Bey, an American doctor and big game hunter who drinks copious amounts of whiskey and beer, wears a khaki suit, and carries an elephant gun. He is fierce, though his prey are dik-diks- a small antelope that is sometimes locally kept as a pet, and that beautiful women are often compared to. As such he is also a lustful character.
- Miriam al-Azraq (Miriam the Black/Dark Blue), a zār counterpart to the Virgin Mary. She asks for a black dress and head shawl, like that of a Catholic nun.
- Gasis Gom Bi Tiyara, a Coptic monk who flies in an airplane.
- Bamba Beya (boy of the ancient monuments), a Turk who is visiting Sudan's pyramids.
- Wad an-Nasara, Ya Mama Miya! is an Italian Christian who hunts waterfowl.
- Aziza, Lady of the Bracelets, is a wealthy Egyptian Copt.
- Hindiya is an East Indian female spirit who drinks Pepsi and has her hosts drape their tobs to look like saris.
- Hashira is a disdainful Victorian English female spirit.
- Jamama is a female Chinese spirit who demands a qipao-style dress of floral silk, and wife of Ard as-Sin.
- Ard as-Sin (Land of China), who lives in England and rules China.
- Sitt an-Nisa (the Lady of Women), a Canadian female spirit. This spirit's independent existence was short-lived, as it was identified as an expression of the Coptic spirit, the Lady of the Bracelets. It was identified as inquisitive and bringing metal to make musical instruments for zār.
- Various other Khawājā spirits, who may be doctors, lawyers, military officers, and airplane pilots. The possessed may dance with a cane, a symbol of authority (other similar symbols being flywhisks, batons, and walking sticks). The spirits may request a European belt and cane as well as items like cigarettes, other clothes, particularly of a Western style, and a radio. They may also request a henna design for the sole of the foot where the heel and ball are covered, but the instep only has three stripes, resembling a sneaker print. They also demand certain foods associated with the West and held in containers, bottled beverages, tinned foods, expensive fruit, biscuits, and white bread. They have mustaches they twist while in humam form. These spirits may also be called Nasarin (Christians) though not all of these spirits are.
- Al-Wardi Karoma, the zār counterpart of Lord Cromer.
- Gordel, the zār counterpart of General Charles Gordon.
- Nimir al-Khala (Leopard of the Dessert) or Nimir Kindo, Babur al Khala (Leopard Kindo, Steamboat of the Desert), who probably represents Sir Samuel Baker.
- Basha Basha, Gordon and Baker's archetypal nemesis, a merchant prince who trafficks South Sudanese into slavery.
- Birulu, lord of the chains, another slave trafficker.
- Basha Birdon, who wears a European suit and a fez. He may be the zār counterpart to Sir Richard Burton.
- Basha Korday, who may be the zār counterpart of Sir Alexander Korda. He has a mustache and wears khaki breeches.
- Hakim Basha, an Egyptian doctor spirit sometimes also described as Turkish or European. While possessing people he diagnoses others present and recommends treatments. He has two manifestations: one is a turn-of-the-century Islamic medical practitioner, who asks for a white jalabiya, long topcoat, fez, and walking stick. The other is a modern doctor who asks for a white labcoat, trousers, a stethoscope, and tongue depressors.
- Basha-t-'Adil, a Khawājā train conductor, and a secretary, who asks for a whistle, a peaked cap, and a European men's suit. He pumps his arm up and down like he's sounding a train whistle.
- Hakim bi-Dūr, a Khawājā doctor.
- Beshir, a comical English man who is uncomfortable in the desert, wiping his face with a handkerchief and carrying a towel over his shoulder.
- Abu Rīsh, Ya Amir ad-Daysh (Owner of the Feather, O Amir of the Army), who asks for a khaki uniform with a wide belt and epaulets, and a topi hat with feathers.
- Other Bashawāt, the "big Khawājāt", who are usually doctors, military officials, and bureaucrats who command respect. They are sometimes called Turks, though not all these spirits are. In Khartoum they include Christians, Jews, and Hindus.
- Holiba 'Arabiya, a male Beja lorry driver. Those possessed by this spirit may wear a kuffiyeh and drape their tob to resemble traditional male Beja dress. He also requests a long toothed comb to wear in the hair. His name is a pun that can refer to an automobile or a female nomad.
- Hassina 'Arabiya, a female spirit who requests Hadendowa jewelry, soured camels milk, and rancid clarified butter.
- Luli Hassina, a female spirit who requests Hadendowa jewelry, soured camels milk, and rancid clarified butter. She and Hassina 'Arabiya are demure, do not speak, and must be "watered" by their husbands like cattle. They may do the jabūdi dance.
- Sulayman al-Bedawi (Sulayman the Bedouin) is Hassina's bridegroom and often demands jirtig paste for his host's hair.
- Ahmed al-Bashir, shaykh of the Nomad spirits who demands a silk tob and whip.
- Jamali, a male with an aggressive personality who demands a sword, a whip, and a Beja tob.
- Mohammed Bikeyfu (beloved of power), a fierce warrior who demands a sword that must be drawn and brandished.
- Bernowi, or Bernawi, who appears in the tumbura Banda khayt's songs as someone who fought the Azande, appears in bori as either a spear carrying West African Muslim from Bornu or a Ta'ishi Baggara Arab who commands those he possesses to carry a spear.
- Wad al-Arab (Son of the Arabs), a child spirit who attends school and wants an adult tob.
- 'Ali Ababa, a child spirit who has lost his father and camel (jamal), and runs around looking for them and crying. Jamal is also a local euphemism for a clitoris, and as participants in zār bori are often adult or married women, if their culture practices female circumcision, they will have undergone it.
- al-Quraishi, a male spirit from Mecca and member of Muhammad's tribe. He asks for a Saudi four-cornered headdress.
- Other 'Arab (Nomad) spirits, who may incline those they possess to sword fight, or do the jabūdi dance. They may ask for clothes and shoes associated with nomads (such as oversized shirts and wide-legged pants), especially Beja, and items like whips. This is the other group likely to possess men. They are usually Beja spirits.
- Munira, Halibiya-t-ag-Guffa (Munira, Halibiya of the Basket) who asks for a green dress, blue tob, and a peddler's basket.
- Abu Munira, Munira's father.
- Nahali (Skinny One) a male Halib spirit.
- Barou Nayyar (Luminous Scraps), another male Halib.
- Other Syrian Domari (Halib) spirits, whose female spirits are known for being forthright and bold when speaking to men, and for convincing people to give them money, often by trickery (an offensive stereotype). Halib women peddle goods, and men make leather items and sharpen and repair tools. These spirits are associated with reproductive disorders, and many are nameless.
- Sarikin Borno, the Sarkin of Bornu. He wears a striped jalabiya and is also classified as a Holy Man spirit.
- Nimir al-Kondo (Leopard of Kondo), a traveling merchant from Chad. He speaks French and wears a fez. He asks for a navy blue vest to wear over a white shirt.
- Meriam, a shameless female spirit who asks for a flat mortar for grinding grain and a deep one for pounding spices. She begs, wears ragged clothes, and requests plain boiled grain and water.
- Abu Bukari, a male spirit who travels by camel and "relies on Allah" to provide food on his pilgrimage. He begs, wears ragged clothes, and requests plain boiled grain and water.
- Tekonday, a Nigerian immigrant to Darfur. He begs, wears ragged clothes, and requests plain boiled grain and water.
- Fallatīyat, the unnamed zār counterparts of Darfuri merchants, who are reputed to do black magic. They ask for brightly colored homespun tobs and gold nose rings (zumām).
- Other Fallata- West African Muslim and West Sudanese Muslim spirits, many of whom are on the Hajj pilgrimage. Fallata is the Kanuri word for the Fulani. These spirits are sometimes called Takarīn (those from Takrur).
- Dinkawi, the Herdsman of Cattle. He asks for cow milk for his host to drink.
- Maryjan, an elderly male slave with a bent posture from a life of hard labor.
- At-Tayr al-Akhdar, the Green Bird, a pagan enslaved man who accompanies his master on Hajj.
- Farigallah (Separated God), an elderly pagan Nuba woman.
- Baharanil (River Nile), a Khudam prostitute.
- Jata, Lady of the Rahat, another Khudam prostitute who wears a white satin dress and a rahat (leather thong skirt).
- Mūna, Sitt ash-Shabāl (Lady of the Shabāl), a southern prostitute who mimicks local village women. The shabāl is a hair flick gesture done by women at weddings that grants luck to others. Both Jata and Mūna act demure at first, but are ultimately flirtatious.
- NyamNyam Kubaida, or Nyam Nyam the Severe Afflicter, an Azande cannibal spirit who may demand raw meat, especially liver (kibda). He tries to make those who possesses take off their clothes.
- Bayakuba as-Sāhar Juba (Bayakuba, the Sorcerer of Juba), a date-loving sorcerer and may demand raw meat. He tries to make those he possesses take off their clothes.
- At-Tumsah, a sorcerer in his animal (crocodile) form. He makes his hosts wear rags and crawl on their bellies.
- Other Khudam/Zirug (South Sudanese) spirits. Many are Nuer, Dinka, Shilluk, Nuba, or from pagan West Sudanese groups. They ask for black clothes and animal hides and pelts (such as leopard pelts). Male spirits ask for spears, ebony walking sticks, and clay pipes. Female spirits ask for grain mortars. All Khudam spirits are thought to know black magic and cause more serious forms of zār affliction. Sorcerer (Sāhar) spirits are all Azande, and from further south than the other Khudam. They are perceived as cannibals and make those they possess try to bite others. By the 2000s, this group of spirits has largely come to be viewed as Christians.
- Many Southerners and Azande cannibals are known as refusing to speak when being questioned by shaykhas.
- A few spirits who don't represent cultural "Others", such as Sitt Amuna and Sakina, daughters of the Sultan of the Red Sea, and Salma, Daughter of the River, who is probably a malayka-t-al-Bahr (angel of the river). Angels of the river in Sudan are tall women with long flowing hair and fish tails who live under the river. They are benevolent but capricious as zār spirits.

In Sennar, which has a melded form of zār combining bori and tumbura, there are:

- the Darawish, spirits of Sufi teachers and holy men.
- Shaikh Ahmad al-Badawi, who is important in Sufism.
- the Awlad Jabir (four sons of Jabir), which are important in Sufism, similar to al-Jilani.
- Yarima Pasha or Shalabi, a Pashawat
- Pashkatib, the clerk and a Pashawat
- Hakim Pasha, the chief doctor and a Pashawat
- Yowra Bey, a Pashawat
- Sharido Bey, a Pashawat
- In all there are said to be 300 Pashawat spirits. They demand their hosts wear light and pastel colors, jalabiyas in white, cream, and ivory, and red fezes. They are vain spirits and often also ask for mirrors. If they speak, they do so in a whisper. They may also be called nas Bayud (white people) or al-Bahriyyat (People of the River). Male and female spirits of this category do not possess the same hosts. The female Pashawat are seen as somewhat intimidating, with obscure origins, disabling afflictions, and difficult demands. They are infrequent in today's zār.
- The Khawājāt, Europeans, who are often given alcohol, such as whisky or wine. The ban of alcohol has led to the Europeans visiting less often, and the respect given to them has declined. The Chinese (nas as-Sin) and Indian (al-Hinud) spirits of this category have instead gained prominence.
- Bashir, a half-brother of Luliyya and Dasholay, who all share an Ethiopian mother. These three are popular in contemporary practice. He wears a red jalabiya with a white cross on his chest and is served coffee. He comes to cure people with zār affliction on Sunday and Wednesday. He also expects alcohol and cigarettes, as does Dasholay. He can be capricious, vulgar, opportunistic, sociable, and affectionate. He and Dasholay speak directly to those who seek them out instead of speaking through a zār medium.
- Luliyya, who retains her flirtatious nature seen elsewhere. She advises people on sexual and reproductive issues and is served Pepsi. Those she possesses wear colorful and attractive clothes.
- Dasholay also advises people. He wears a black jalabiya with a white cross on his chest. His father is said to be a Black soldier.
- Other Habashi, Ethiopians, who often dance around wearing heavy anklets and are sometimes offered local alcohol.
- the nas Arab, Arab nomads
- and the nas Zirug, Black warriors from the mountains who dance with the same heavy anklets as the Habashi and may wear red fezes tilted at an angle. They are sometimes offered local alcohol.

The zār Nyamānyam adherents name some of their spirits to be:

- Abd al-Qadir al-Jilani
- Tumburani, the king (malik) of the Sudani
- Shakir Manzo
- Nimr al-Kindo, also called Jabahana. In bori this spirit is called Nimr al-Kindo Babura.
- Babīnga and Nakūrma, Azande ancestral spirits.

== Ceremonies ==
Generally, the zār follows this pattern: the possessed person becomes ill or is struck by misfortune, often seeks the help of more conventional medicine (as is often encouraged by zār leaders), and once this fails, they seek out the aid of the zār community. In Egypt, zār and conventional medicine may be used simultaneously. For the Sudanese zār tumbura, those who come to a shaykha complaining of illness are told to seek out certain medicines and then return for therapy, but seemingly not with the implication that the medicine alone will fix the ailment. Hofriyati zār bori practitioners hold that the only treatment for zār affliction is zār itself, that medicine won't help, and that attempting an exorcism will worsen the affliction.

In Egypt, Bahrain, and Oman it has historically been noted that zār leaders are not only mostly women, but also mostly Black.

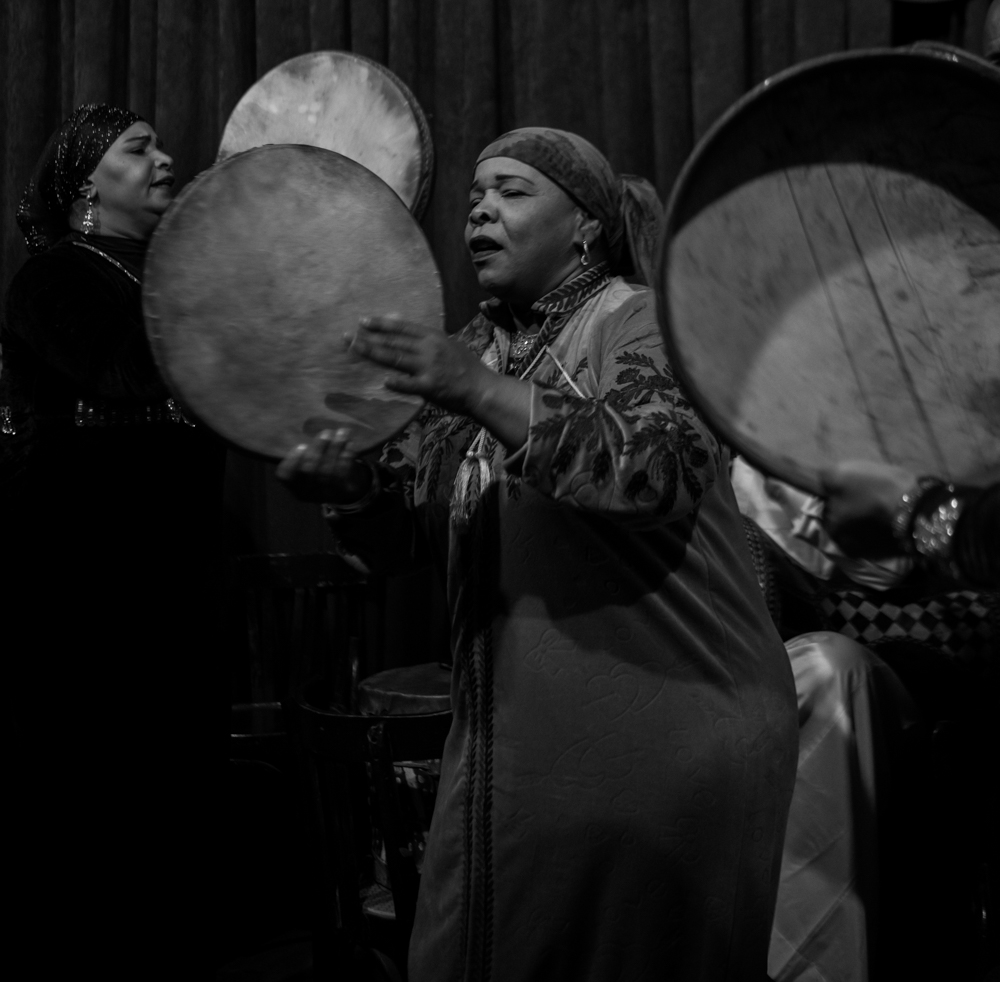
Women playing music for a zār in Egypt.

In Iran and Egypt, the zār spirit is identified by the response of the possessed to the music. Different tunes are played, changing every so often to invoke different spirits.

=== Arabia ===
In 19th century Mecca, zār affliction often took the form of collapsing, convulsions, diseases that initially resemble normal ones, and fits of rage. The zār leader's title was "Sheikha ez-Zār". She would question the zār spirit, either in Arabic or in the "zār language", which only she and the spirit understood. The spirit would agree to a ceremony being held in a certain day, as well as the usual placation offerings of clothes and jewelry. The afflicted invited her friends, and tea, coffee, pipes, and food would be enjoyed as the Sheikha and her attendants performed zār songs with a drum.

In an account given by Dijkstra in Neglected Arabia, the zār ceremony in Arabia is called kabsh (ram) because the sacrifice is central, and this sacrifice is a ram. It begins in the evening with a simple dinner. After dinner end, a chant is done for an hour, and after that the people in attendance crawl until they are exhausted. There is a break, and the musicians begin as the central patient comes in riding the ram that will be sacrificed, which is decorated with green twigs. This happens at either midnight or dawn (if the person considers themself important). They circle the room three or four times.

The participants rest until an hour after daybreak, and the central patient rides again. After this, the ram is slaughtered by the rider, the leader of the ceremony, and a third party. All the blood is collected in a bowl, and some is put in a glass with saffron and sugar, which is drunk. The rest is used to "bathe" the central patient, who takes an hour-long nap, then bathes to wash off the blood and dresses in new clothes.

During this the sacrificial meal is prepared, and every part of the animal is cooked and used. The food is put out, and a stick that was anointed in the blood is held in front of the central patient (called the zār in this form of the rite). The leader asks them to ensure everything is as the spirit wishes it and that they have no further requests. If the spirit refuses to answer, the stick will be used to deliver a beating until it does.

=== Egypt ===
Identifying the possessing spirit may take quite some time, potentially years, especially as zār possession may not be suspected by the possessed or their family, even if they assume another type of possession and seek out exorcism as treatment. Further, they may be reluctant to seek out the zār community if they are not already a part of it, as it is a long-term commitment requiring a fair amount of expense. The zār leader or an old initiate is consulted in identifying the spirit and its demands. The sid al-ras ("spirit/master of the head") aids them in this. One of the rituals to do so involves using incense in the home of the possessed person to make the spirit come forward and speak through the possessed person, make them sleepy, or appear in their dreams. The spirit may also be found through coffee cup divination, or a similar method.

If the spirit is stubborn or this home ritual cannot be done, another ritual called "revealing the trace" (kashf al-atar) is performed. The zār leader takes a piece of cloth with the "smell" of the possessed person's body (such as underwear or a headscarf) and a piece of paper with the possessed person's name and their mother's name written on it. Before going to sleep, the zār leader performs a rite with incense and places the two items under their pillow for three consecutive days, prompting the spirit to appear in their dreams. This is called tabyita. Upon identifying the spirit, reconciliation rites may be arranged, though these may not be for a while.

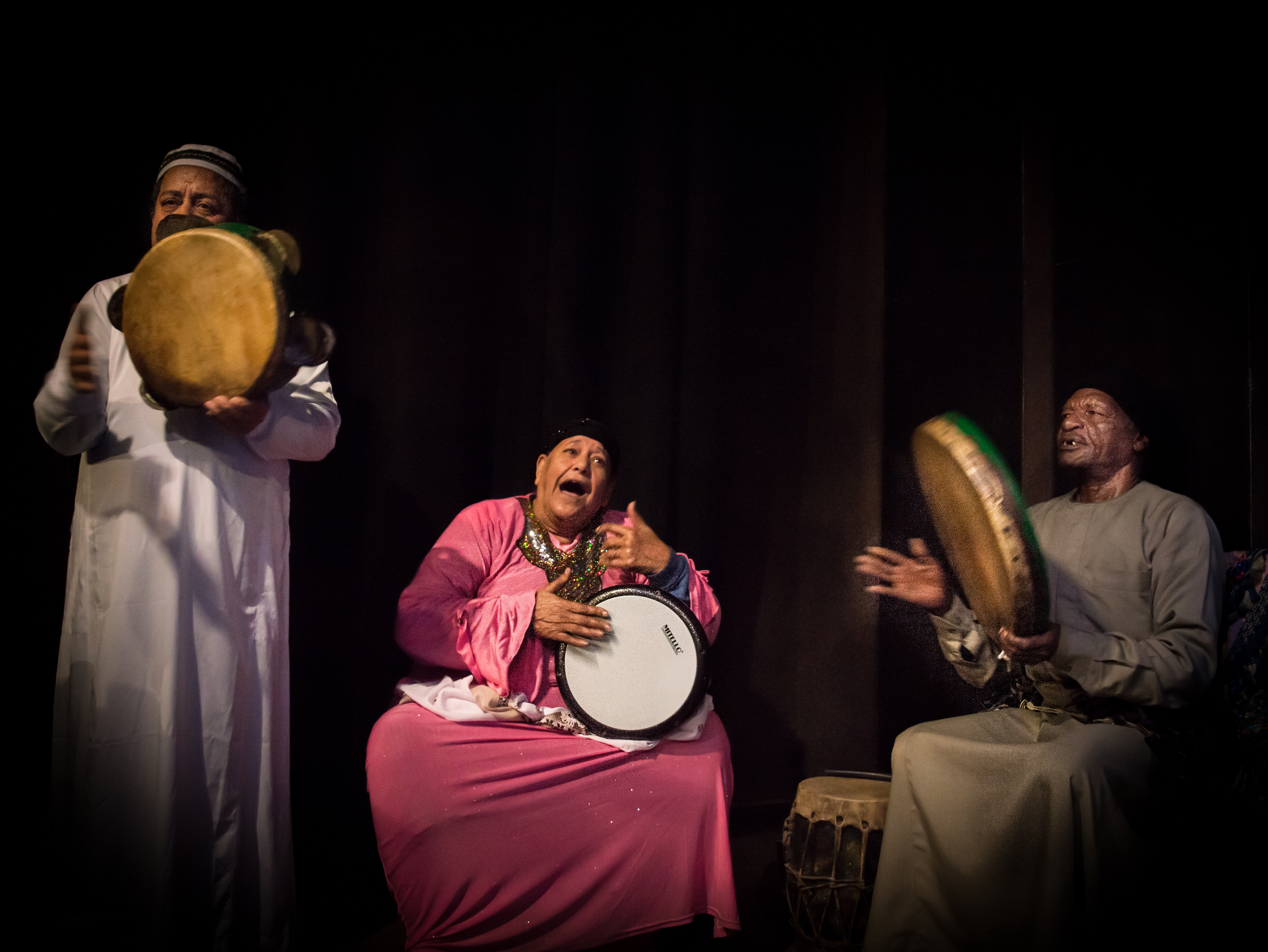
Members of the Zar Masters

The hadra (presence) is a weekly public musical ritual held in the home of the zār leader, limited to the musical part of placating the spirits, and may temporarily appease spirits on the part of those who can't yet commit the money or time for an initiation. This may be located near a saint's shrine, though it has long been illegal to hold zār rituals at shrines themselves. Initiates who know their spirits may also call this ritual tazkira (reminder), which is the purpose it serves for them. New and old initiates go into trance and dance at these, and the crowd consists of those who can't afford their annual zār ceremony, those who attend regularly, and curious outsiders. Zār leaders and musicians watch the crowd (who sit on the floor at the edges of the room) and encourage people to the dance floor based on their reactions, such as facial expressions, which indicate possession. A possessed person who hasn't identified their spirit may attend up to three hadras and the spirit may be summoned during this, with music and incense, and the leader may ask the spirits to fulfill their demands. Before going on the dancefloor, one gives money to the band, which is ritually circled around the person's head, kissed, and put away to be divided up later. If a possessed person passes out, they have pressure put on their head and are sprinkled with rosewater.

Initiation rites may be called sulha (reconciliation), 'adq (contract), or midan (vista), as well as 'edwa (feast), tazkira (reminder) for those who are already initiated, or madyafa or diyafa (hosting) if the sacrifice is a sheep, goat, or larger animal, like a camel or bull. It is a celebration done to acknowledge and placate the spirits using sacrifice, dance, offerings (like incense, spirit paraphernalia, etc.), and other rituals. 'Akkam ("in a bundle"/"one in all") may occur, a rite where the initiate and all their guests consume the sacrificed animal together. Non-initiates may not eat the meat of this animal; doing so may provoke the spirits. At one time these rituals took seven days and nights. On the seventh day, a rite signifying the end of ritual seclusion occurred where parts of the skulls of the sacrificed animals would be disposed of in the Nile. Today this most commonly begins at sunset, occurs over the course of a day and an evening, and marks the beginning of a 7 (sometimes 3 or 5) day period of seclusion. During seclusion, the possessed only eats of the animal sacrifice, abstains from sex and opposite-sex affection. During this time one is "with the spirits" (ma'a al-asyad). A rite may be performed alone to end the period, called "as clear as milk" (safi ya laban), or one may have a zār of the river (zār al-bahr) where the bones of sacrifices are disposed of. At all of these, milk products like yogurt or rice pudding are used, with white symbolizing the end of a spirit's anger.

Zārs are broadly of two types: silent ('al-sakt) and drummed zār (daqqet). The first is more common, because it is less expensive and more private. Being known to be involved in the zār can be a source of anxiety. During the silent zār, one sets an offering table the evening before and performs a ritual animal sacrifice. The offerings on the table may include clothes, food, candles, and special objects. The blood of the animal is collected on a plate and used for anointing the jewelry, body, and parts of the home. The sacrificed animal is then cooked and eaten. It is done by a zār leader or the initiates alone, if they are experienced. The remaining blood is poured into the toilet as an offering to the spirits. After the silent zār, many go to the hadra later that day or the next day. The silent zār is considered secret, while the drummed zār is more public. Because of this, it is hard to tell how widespread zār is in Egypt and how strong belief in it currently is. Many have turned to silent zār instead of drummed because of finances, and because of limited access to musical groups.

The drummed zār is characterized by music, which is used to draw the spirits to manifest by making the possessed dance. The changes in facial expression are considered to be that of the spirit. In parts of Upper Egypt, those whose spirits are known covered their faces at one time to hide the facial expressions during trance, which could be grotesque. In private zārs, the possessed buys a trousseau of dresses, shawls, and scarves, which they often wear to every zār ceremony they attend. In Alexandria and other parts of Egypt, it was common for wealthy devotees to sponsor drummed zārs, whereas in Cairo, devotees tended to sponsor ceremonies dedicated just to themselves.

Every zār song has three sections, that may be rearranged as needed. The first section moves one's emotions and causes the spirits to appear, calling them forth. The second section is a description, often praising the spirit. The third section induces trance. This section in particular may be moved, as each person is considered possessed by at least a male and female spirit, and needs at least two songs to be played. When this happens the third section of the first song will be shorter, and the third section of the last song will be longer. The exact length of the song depends on how long it takes for someone to go into trance. A song may be fully repeated to this end. Each spirit gets its own song, unless a person has a personal or unrecognized spirit, in which case a generic song is used.

Once placated the zār spirits protect the possessed, bring them prosperity, and can help them divine. After the initial placation of the spirit or spirits, the person tries to hold a zār once a year to continue to keep the peace. If they cannot afford it, they often attend a hadra (a type of weekly ceremony), sometimes after having a "silent" zār at home.

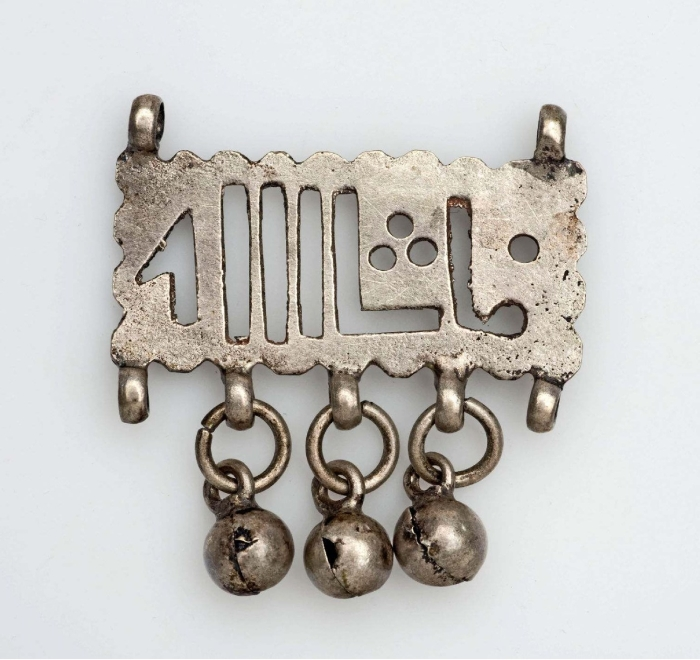
A silver amulet with an Arabic inscription.

Zārs are flexible, with durations expanding and collapsing depend on the economics and other concerns of the possessed. The numbers 1, 3, 5, and 7 appear often for durations, spirits in pantheons, numbers of items used in rituals, and more. The Fatiha is recited at the start of many zār ceremonies in a ritual called "the Openings" (al-fawatih), accompanied by use of incense (this being a separate rite called al-bukhoor) to purify the bodies of those present and make them attractive to spirits. Certain scents are said to be more attractive to certain spirits. At the start, money is discreetly placed on the tray the incense burner is held on; the zār leader kisses it, touches to their head, and puts it away. The tray is held under the possessed person's chin as the Fatiha is recited; aloud by the zār leader, silently by everyone else. A veil is often put over the person's head so the incense will gather underneath it to be inhaled. The tray is passed under the right arm, left arm, and placed between the legs so the smoke goes under the person's garment, then the right and left foot are lifted over the burner as the recitation continues. This is also used to diagnose possession and to invite spirits into dreams.

Before animals are sacrificed, they are given ablution in clean water, their faces being washed three times. Basins for this water and to collect the blood are needed. Candles are distributed among initiates and lit. The zār jewelry is taken off and put in a specially bought china plate (tabaq ghasheem) which will be used to collect blood. A call for gifts of money happens during the ablution. Paul Kahle claims the sacrifice is performed over the head of the possessed, so they can drink the blood as it comes forth. It is also claimed that the feathers and claws of sacrificial birds are set aside as gifts to the spirit; neither practice is mentioned by Al Hadidi.

The mayanga (from a Hausa word meaning "cemetery") is only built by serious zār participants who have undergone multiple initiations and wish to become zār leaders. It is a private shrine where the bones of animal sacrifices are placed, and can provide direct access to one's possessing spirits, and resultingly increases a person's power. This power in the mayanga must be renewed with sacrificial remains and blood. The mayanga may be used even after the person who originally built it has died.

To become a zār leader, one must undergo the "girding" (al-hizam) ceremony and identify the "master of the head" (sid al-ras), who helps them in divination. Those who inherit their position from their parents also undergo a special ritual where their parent passes on their incense burner and box. Those chosen by their spirits to become leaders buy these items new, and during their girding ceremony anoint them with sacrificial animal blood. The sacrifices for the "girding" ceremony may include 2-4 sheep, a camel, or a bull. Not all who undergo the "girding" ceremony become public zār leaders- some really only offer services to family and friends (called sheikh habaybo or sheikhat habayebha), and others who don't provide services to others are called sheikh nafso or sheikhat nafsaha (his/her own sheikh).

In Egypt, altars for the spirits are often set up, decorated with flowers, candles, and sweets.

=== Ethiopia ===
Zār doctors are sometimes women (while a career as another form of traditional healer may be restricted to only men), and patients are typically women in "conversion" zār and group therapy zār. The doctors may use their personal Zār, if it is a stronger spirit, to overpower the zār of a patient. Traditional Ethiopian medicines function complementarily to each other, so zār is not precisely a last resort, but it is often viewed as such. Certain ailments are seen as entirely unrelated to zar, and basically incurable, such as people suffering from what Western medicine recognizes as schizophrenia.

The zar doctor is called a "bala Zar" (master of zar), or zar bala, and diagnoses if a patient is suffering from zar, the evil eye, or incurable illness. Zar doctors use trance and group therapy, performing the functions of diagnosis, treatment, prognosis, and prevention. Healers in Ethiopia fall into different types, but most cultivate some knowledge of multiple forms of healing, though they will be addressed according to their primary specialty. Zar doctors compete with each other at an annual zar convention, presenting their style, technique, and innovations before the public for the purpose of both spreading knowledge and growing their own reputation with the public. Failures in treatment are tolerated, with the understanding that humans are weaker than the spirits, or that not being cured is the will of God. Complications are similarly understood as a spirit being particularly difficult. In group therapy zar, zar doctors are themselves former patients, who have learned how to control their spirits, and how to voluntarily enter and exit trance. This is done as an apprenticeship to another zār doctor, and during this they also learn which spirits cause which behaviors. Zār doctors are considered especially powerful if they inherit their ability through their mother, and this is more common for female doctors. Male doctors usually say they simply had an apprenticeship, or that they were kidnapped by the spirits as children and taught how to communicate with them. They must behave and dress extravagantly, with a degree of arrogance. Female zār bala are less arrogant, and are sometimes considered superior to male zār bala. The zār doctors of group therapy zar have not only mastered their spirit, but all zār spirits, and are commonly possessed by many spirits.

The situation and class of the patient is taken into account when making a diagnosis. A poor patient is possessed by lower-ranked spirits of the servant class. Zār spirits may cause clumsiness, fertility issues, stupor, apathy, catatonia, hysteria (caused by "silly and irresponsible" female spirits), fits of self-violence (other forms of violence, such as violence directed against others, are attributed to other spirits), epileptic episodes, and occasionally physical ailments like rheumatism (caused by a "lazy" zār that makes their horse stay in place). Instances of hysteria will be marked by baby talk, demanding gifts, teasing, being silly, and general infantile and feminine behavior. It is believed that a female spirit who possesses a man will destroy his masculinity if the spirit isn't brought under the control of a zār doctor. Apathy and stupor may be exhibited as a woman sitting huddled in a corner, refusing to eat, and not responding to prolonged drumming. These symptoms need to be treated early, as otherwise they are thought to progress to total catatonia and eventually death.

The act of possession employs a riding metaphor, and the spirits may call those they possess "farasey" (my horse). When a zār of one sex possesses someone of the opposite sex, this has an erotic connotation and is viewed as a form of coitus.

While waiting for the zār doctor to arrive, a catatonic patient is not left alone. Her neighbors sing, dance, play the drums, and talk to her, all in an attempt to get her to respond. The patient may also be brought to the doctor's house, where things will be set up for the proceedings and the zār devotees gathered. Their family will give a bit of "incense money" to gain entry. The patient is ignored by the doctor until they are in trance.

To diagnose the patient, the zar doctor first matches the afflicted behavior to a spirit. Then, the doctor compels the spirit to give its name, confirming the diagnosis and taking away the spirit's power. Without this, a zār can "ride the patient to death". This process may involve goading the spirit, tricking it into harming itself (by picking up a hot coal), beating the patient (these are not as common for zar as they are with other spirits), covering the patient with a shama (a white veil), and playing music to convince it to dance, making coffee and burning incense. The dancing is called gurri, the victory dance of the zār. The movements betray the identity of the spirit. During the dance, the patient enters trance and the doctor questions it, asking what it likes and doesn't like, if it does this or that, if it is familiar with this region, shortcomings the patient has including those that may have offended the zār, and so on. The doctor may enter trance themselves during the proceedings to utilize the power of their spirit. Music in the form of hymns and handclapping takes place, in part to keep up the energy of the proceedings. The diagnostic portion of this form bears an overall resemblance to a court trial.

Treatment involves negotiating with the spirit and is considered successful if the patient feels relief after trance. Once the name is revealed, the doctor asks what would please the spirit, and it will name some items and an animal. These will be procured (they are called the love gift to the zar, maqwadasha) and the animal is sacrificed. The patient eats some of the meat. The doctor may also give the patient an herbal charm or amulet to wear around their neck if they are familiar with those forms of medicine, and zār doctors also make preventative charms. Paul Kahle claims the sacrifice animal is usually a chicken, and that it is swung around the head of the possessed person, and thrown to the floor. If it does not die soon, he says, the sacrifice is considered to have been in vain.

Zār rituals for group therapy zar are periodic, and must be so to keep the possession under control. Much of the time, they use the imagery of a wedding. In a ritual described as a "marriage communion", the possessed is called "musharra" (newly wed), and is accompanied by two "mize". The mize attend to the possessed and ensure they don't injure themselves while dancing, and provide support to other members of the group. They themselves are adherents of zār. Zār groups provide a space where unacceptable behaviors aren't criticized and are empathized with. This is particularly important and attractive to women in patrilocal living situations, religious minorities, and former slaves. The group and the zar doctor act as support for patients. Zār meetings and ceremonies usually take place at night, as the spirits themselves are nocturnal. There is a special language used by zār adherents, a form of cant argot. Group therapy zār is most similar to zār found outside Ethiopia.

To please the zār spirits and prevent possession, many people wear charms, burn incense at the entrance of the house, and drink black coffee.

In the name of the most powerful zār spirit possessing them, the zār bala may set up an altar to them in their home in the form of a coffee tray (ganda).

In "conversion zār", a woman prepares to be possessed on a holiday (though she may not be certain of which it will be) by wearing special clothes reserved for zār (often men's clothes), zār beads, perfume, and other ornaments. She may carry a whip, steel bar, or empty gun. A spread of food and drinks will be made and set out, and no one should eat from it before the zār spirit. This spread includes the special sacrifice animal selected in accordance to the particular spirit. If the zār does not come at all, she and her neighbors will enjoy the feast. Normally, however, the zār will come, and will act through her body; exhibiting the usual signs of zār possession, dancing, eating embers, behaving self-violently and erratically, or singing the spirit's song. The possession may last hours or days. Through it, the neighbors (male and female) gather and sing and dance to please the zār, so it does not harm his "horse". They also promise gifts of beads, jewelry, clothes, and sacrifices on behalf of the horse. They themselves are not usually possessed: the important bond is that of neighborhood, not possession. At the end, the spirit may bless them or warn their horse to be good before leaving. Once gone, the possessed sleeps for several hours and wakes with no memory of what occurred.

In seer zār, people come on Friday nights to the house of a zār doctor (usually a man who learned from his father). He has mastered only his own spirit, and uses it for divination. They are served coffee as the doctor sits behind a curtain, dressed in special clothes and jewelry, and often holding a steel bar or whip. At the right time, the doctor comes out and calls forth his spirit. People may sing and clap as he dances and does things like eating hot coals. People describe their problems, and the spirit gives them solutions. Each person pays a small amount at the end.

All forms of Ethiopian zār have common elements of special clothes, perfume, serving coffee, animal sacrifice, drumming, dance, and so on.

=== Iran ===
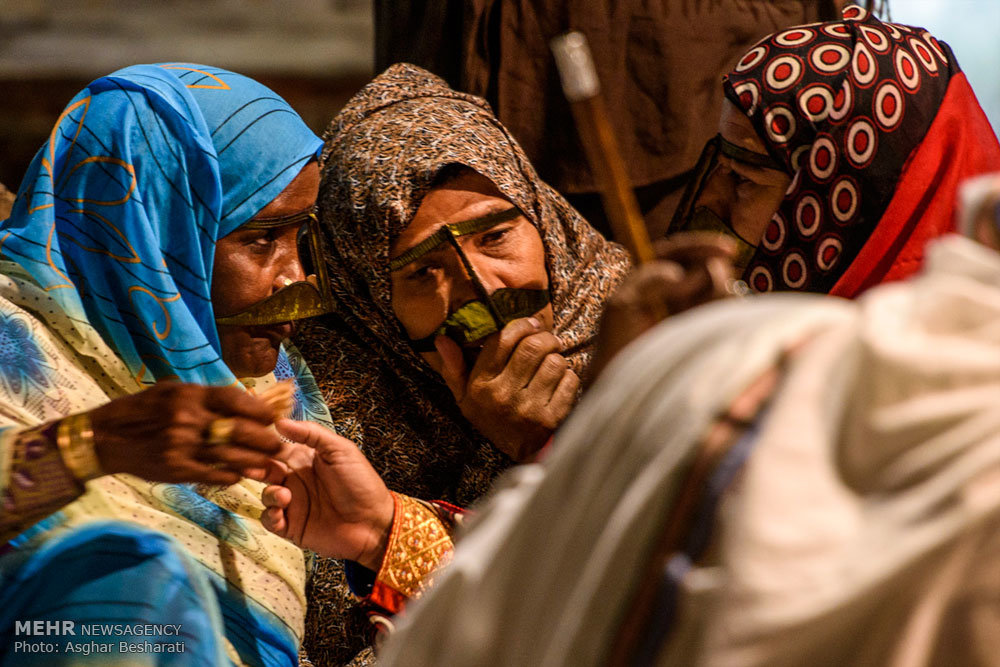
Women at a zār

In Iran, zār leaders are called Bābā zār or Māmā zār (or just Bābā (male) or Māmā (female)), instead of Sheikh or Sheikha, and zār leaders are Black. They often inherit their position from their parents, and they either appoint a successor, or the local community elects a new leader after their death. They have their own stands, with drums, other instruments, and clay pots for incense. Before seeking their help, a possessed person may have sought the help of a sheikh or mulla. Unlike in Egypt, they may not necessarily be possessed themselves, though this is the case for many.

Newly possessed people stay in a bamboo hut on the beach or in the home of Bāba/Māmā zār in the week before their first zār and after a payment for the ceremony has been agreed upon, during which they are bathed in seawater and rubbed with a mixture of herbs and spices (such as basil, saffron, bukhish (a local plant), cardamom, walnut, chicken's tongue, guraku, and gešt/gasht (an Indian wood from Mumbai)) soaked in rosewater and called girkou. They also may drink some of this. This is called the separation phase by researchers. This time can last a day, or it may take several weeks, and may also include certain foods, contact with women, or looking at certain animals (such as dogs and chickens) being forbidden. The morning after this time ends, they are bathed and rubbed with a mixture containing the "dust of seven paths" and seven leaves of seven thornless plants.

Some reports say that after this and before the zār itself, the possessed person is laid on the floor, with their big toes tied together by goat hair, fish oil is rubbed under their nose, and the Bābā or Māmā skips around while brandishing a bamboo stick (bakol), and threatens the spirit. Others say the same, except fish oil is rubbed on the body and goat hair is burned under the nose.

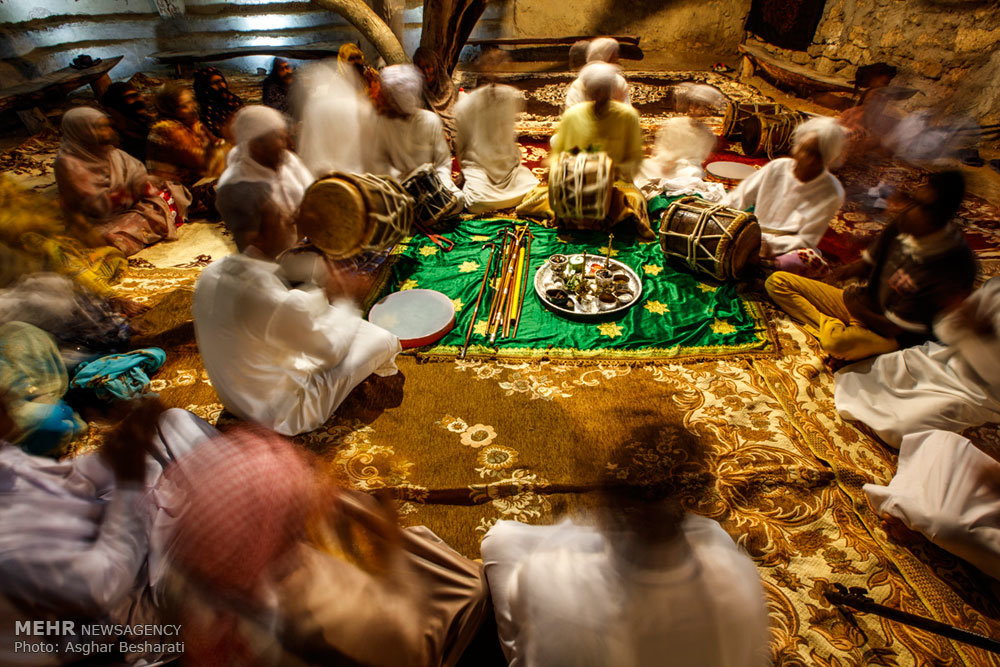
Photo of the Maidān, showing the drums and trays

The zār itself (also called the incorporation phase by researchers) takes place in a U-shaped area called a Maidān, with the possessed person, tea, and a tablecloth in the center. The tablecloth has lotus fruits (kunar), food, the meat and blood of the animal sacrifice, eggs, dates, confetti, and herbs on it. The possessed person has their head covered with white cloth, then a tray with aromatic herbs laid over burning charcoal is passed around as incense, and musical proceedings begin. Different instruments are used, such as flutes, but the most important of which are drums. Three types are reportedly used are the modendo/mudendu, gap dohol (large drums, the former being a kettledrum), and kesar (a small drum). The instruments are fumigated with incense before the ceremony, and in front of the modendo, a silver tray of gashtahsuz and kundruk (dried incense herbs) is placed before it. The Bābā or Māmā plays this drum while singing, and signals the beginning of the ceremony and music with their bamboo stick. Singing may be in a different language or it may be sounds without meaning.

As people enter, they do not greet each other or speak while sitting. If they drink tea or coffee, they do not put it on the floor and instead hold it until someone comes and collects cups. People sit on the floor, men and women beside each other, and men and women dance and sing together, responding in chorus to the Bābā or Māmā.

Once identified, the leader communicates with the spirit in a language that's a mixture of Persian, Arabic, Swahili, and Indian (often Malayalam or Marathi), one of these languages by themselves, or potentially in gibberish, to find out why the possession happened and what the spirit wants. To assure the spirit its demands will be met, a cloth is tied around the possessed person's arm (a "binding"). This is also allows the possessed person time to gather the money and requested items for placating the spirit.

Bābās and Māmās specialize in which spirits they can deal with- if they find the person is possessed by a spirit they cannot deal with, they recommend a Bābā or Māmā that can manage the spirit. If regular Bābās and Māmās fail, they may send the person to a gaptaran, the most powerful Bābā or Māmā in a region. If the ritual is for zār infidel spirit, no one is allowed to mention God, Muhammad, or the 14 holy persons, or else the spirit will never be placated. If after trying multiple times for many days, the spirit cannot be placated, the Bābās and Māmās will cease to work with the patient and they will be considered tahrans, an outcast and hated status.

If the demand is simple, it is handled at this ceremony. If it isn't, another ceremony is held where the demand is fulfilled. The zār or bazi (ceremony) can last for up to a week. During its duration, no one leaves- if they are tired, they sleep there. Demands can vary from wanting a small piece of bamboo, to prayers, to wanting an animal sacrifice (typically a sheep or goat), to white perfumed fabric, to wanting the possessed person to be beaten with a piece of bamboo. In the last case, beatings may be repeated at subsequent zārs, or may be done whenever the person feels ill again. This is a common treatment for sailors that go out to sea for a month or more. The bamboo usually has two silver beads or is decorated with silver rings, and on the day before the ceremony, it is covered with henna and fish oil. The surface will also be decorated with silver. Another common request is for a special veil called a lang or languta, made of two pieces of local shateh fabric, eight meters in length and sewn together with blue, yellow, and green silk thread.

Some participants claim to have drunk the blood of animal sacrifices in the ceremonies, and some say Bābās and Māmās increase in credibility with the more blood they consume.

In the past, it was reported beautiful young virgin women in bright clothes ("daughters of the wind" dukhtaran-i hava, also seen in Bahrain) would show up and sing and dance, but this no longer seems to be the case. Those who attend ceremonies to sing and play instruments but are not possessed are called safi or "people of love" (ahl-i ashq).

Today, due to legal prohibitions, the only official zārs take place in the form of performances at folkloric music festivals, though private zārs still occur as a healing practice.

=== Oman ===
In Muscat, Fanny Lutton (a missionary) recorded that Bait-e-Zaar was the largest and most expensive "house of sorcery". She recounts that blood of the animal sacrifice was used liberally to anoint the possessed, and that it was drunk. By her account, Black enslaved women danced at the ceremonies, and the possessed danced with them until she was exhausted.

Possession is partially determined by the afflictions experienced by the possessed. The affliction will not be treatable by normal methods, and common elements include: persistent headaches, dizziness, insomnia, lack of appetite, loss of senses and time, inability to work, narcolepsy, pain, and fits of anger, singing, laughing, crying, and head-banging.

Zar leaders may inherit their position or be called to it. They may be male or female, and the titles given to them are Umm al Zar (Mother of Zār), Aqeed al Zar (Commander of Zār), or Sheikh/Sheikhah Ziran. They have mastery over the spirits and can summon them within themselves at will. At zār ceremonies, the zār leader induces their own spirit to possess them, and then tries to "lure" the patient's zār.

The initiation/"exorcism" ceremony is called a ramsa and lasts between one and seven days. Ramsas are not held during pilgrimage, prayer, Ramadan, or on Fridays. The ramsa is considered temporary relief. More lasting relief cones from initiation, and reoccurrence of symptoms or the spirit taking over at ceremonies is likely. The patient (mobtala'a, meaning possessed or afflicted one) wears special clothes and fasts till the end of the ceremony, sitting in the center of proceedings. The zār leader wears colorful clothes and carries a cane, while singing zār songs and closely watching the patient. The patient's reactions to the songs are used to diagnose which spirits possess them. The zār leader's singing is accompanied by drums, usually three. They are played slowly at first, with the music gradually speeding up. In addition to their own sings, zār spirits are associated with certain beats. People's movements correspond to the intensity of the drums.

First, the identity of the spirit must be determined. Questions are asked of it in Arabic or "zār language". If the spirit is uncooperative, the spirit is flogged (via the patient), cajoled, or provoked into revealing itself. If absolutely no zār reveals itself, zār is not considered to be the real cause of affliction. If a spirit does reveal itself, it makes it clear why it has possessed someone. It will ask for things related to envy, jealousy, social relationships, or just for general gifts. It may warn of some impending danger as well. If the demands are reasonable, they are generally agreed to.

After this, the patient dances, temporarily expelling the spirit. They then collapse, trance, and "sleep". The zār leader orders the sacrifice of an appropriate animal and the patient is given its blood to drink.

=== Somalia ===
Saar ceremonies in diaspora are usually private, with only friends or family invited. It is difficult to find the leaders and specialists to do them, and saar is stigmatized by many Muslims. If a woman falls ill, she may arrange one of these, attempt to go to Somalia for a big ceremony, or try to deal with it through "conventional" Islamic methods, such as exorcism. A saar group leader is called a calaqad.

Sitaat and saar rituals have similar features. Sitaat are also called Nebi-Ammaan, Hawa iyo Faadumo or Abbey Sittidey, and are effectively, dhikr ceremonies for women. They are organized and led by women, and women sing at them. Praises are sung for God, the Prophet, Sufi saints, and important women in early Islam. Unmarried women usually don't participate, but all classes of married, divorced, and widowed women do. Sitaat groups may gather in a room at the house of the leader that has been set aside for xadra (pronounced hadra), decorated with photos of saint's tombs, embroidered hangings, and containing rosaries. Others may rent a room to use for ceremonies. Carpets are spread out on the floor before the ceremony starts. Ceremonies are often at least once a week, and sometimes more frequent than that. The days of the week are associated with different people important to Somali Sufism, including figures such as al-Jilani. The ceremonies often go from 3:30 pm to 6:30 pm. Incense are perfume are important, and everyone contributes by bringing small amounts if money, perfume, incense, food or drink. Sweet black coffee is a common drink.

During the sitaat, the women did in a circle, each covered by a large scarf. One or two women play drums as the participants chant, and some may stand and dance. The songs differ between groups, especially as new ones are composed, and the order they are in sometimes varies. Praises are always sung for God and the Prophet first. After that is usually al-Jilani and other saints, Adam, Eve, and Muslim women such as Hagar, Mary mother of Jesus, the Prophet's mother and foster mother, and the Prophet's wives and daughters. Some praise the women before the saints, as the women came before them and were their mothers. The spirits of some of these honored women may be present. During the songs, some women fall into religious trance, swaying and bending their bodies, covering their faces with their scarf, and even falling unconscious after a series of especially wild movements.

People also pray together at sitaat, ask for advice or aid with problems, discuss dreams, and fundraise for members struggling with financial problems. Sitaat are sometimes organized in the name of the ill and women soon to give birth, as well as women about to return to the diaspora from a trip visiting home, as well as for other groups wishing for blessing in their enterprise and weddings. Adoration of God, and unity among women and all people are stressed at and in regard to sitaat. Leaders at sitaat are strict about appropriate behavior and stress the seriousness of the ceremony. Sitaat is less common in the diaspora, mostly for practical reasons, as is saar.

The influence of saar on sitaat can be seen in that originally, no one danced at sitaat, instead sitting and keeping to themselves. Further, sitaat used to mostly be a practice among poor women. Many attendees now also dress in nice clothes and makeup.

Both sitaat and saar involve slaughtering animals and eating together, drumming, clapping, singing, dancing, the use of perfumes and incense, female socializing, and trance. However, trance is different in each: saar trance happens to the ill, and religious trance (muraaqo) does not, though occasionally a jinn may come to a woman's trance and cause her to behave especially wildly. This happens to new members typically, and sitaat participants believe the saar will leave the woman permanently if she joins the sitaat group.

=== Sudan ===
==== Tumbura ====
The zār tumbura involves a four-stage process. First is a divination to determine if possession is the cause of the ailment, done by a shaykha (female ritual leader, also called a usta or ummiyya). If it is, the second step is therapy (fatah al-'ilba), a seven-day seclusion in the house of the shaykha while traditional medicines and incense is used. Certain food and drink may be prohibited during this period. Once symptoms cease, the two day thanksgiving ceremony (gadah al-bayād) occurs. Then there is a seven-day initiation ceremony (called kursī), which culminates in the sacrifice of a white sheep in front of four cult banners, (bawāriq, which are raised in the eastern side of the courtyard) in honor of Al-Jilanī, whereupon they then drink some of the blood, symbolizing permanent connection to tumbura. After this, the new initiate is taken to the Nile and washed by the sanjak, who also disposes of the sacrificial remains in the water. These last two steps are done under the authority of a sanjak, a male tanbūra musician and leader. Members of the group (former patients who went through this process themselves) gather at these last two steps. The tatriq homily is performed at every tumbura celebration.

Afflictions treated by tumbura range from bodily aches to paralysis. Treatment follows the general zār pattern of the first attempt at treatment through Western medicine, then more conventional traditional Islamic medicine, and finally going to the zār adherents. In cases where divination does not confirm that zār is the cause, it is often said the illness has come from God directly, and it is God who can take it away. All affliction is seen as an expression of the same illness. Upon initiation, it is viewed as a matter of "one spirit, one illness, one medicine" coalescing. Just as the tumbura unifies these three things, it also unifies non-Arabs into an identity as the Muslim Sudanese original people (nās ali).

The traditional tumbura divination method is called 'alaq. It determines whether one is possessed, which khayt or khayts are responsible, and specific steps to follow. It has fallen out of favor as of the 1980s, as it costs more than other methods. To have it done, the patient brings the shaykha a piece of dirty cloth they've worn, 2 ratls of sugar, 1 ratl of sugar (actual amounts vary), a bottle of Bint al-Sudan perfume, and a 2 PT coin. The coin is usually provided by the shaykha in actuality, as it hasn't been used as currency in decades. Some may also need to bring cigarettes and matches. The perception is all these items are wrapped in the cloth and sprayed with perfume, but in reality the shaykha usually puts in the coin, a few dates or sweets, a few beans, and a teaspoon of sugar. The other items brought are used mundanely, and the bundle is put under her pillow for 3 or 7 days. The khayt or khayts appear in her dreams and confess to being responsible. It asks for the traditional ceremonies, initiation of the patient, and sometimes additional items like clothes and jewelry. These items are not used outside ceremonies, and may be loaned out by the shaykha for patient use. The patient may appear in the dream themself. Another divination method that has fallen out of use involved the shaykha rubbing her thumb into the patient's palm or forehead, then trying to see if she could smell the khayt's incense. If nothing resulted, 'alaq would proceed.

Instead of 'alaq, today many opt for exposing the patient to different kinds of incense in a ceremony called fatah al-'ilba. This is a method used by many other variants of zār, including bori. Ideally this happens the same day as kāshif. Every shaykha is possessed by multiple khayt, of which one dominates. This one aids her in the work of diagnosis. The day she does kāshif on is determined by this dominant spirit- for example, Banda's shaykhas do it on Saturday. On this day, patients and guests come to her home, talk, and are served coffee and drinks before the proceedings. The khayt talks through the shaykha to the patient, and discussion occurs to determine the cause of illness. This is a more directly collaborative form of divination than 'alaq is.

Upon confirmation of the zār spirit's involvement, the patient decides whether or not to proceed with treatment. They usually do, though they often also discuss it with their family. The family pays the shaykha and gives her 10 ratls of sugar, 1 1/2 a ratl of coffee and tea each, 3 packs of cigarettes, 3 packs of matches, 7 candles, 3 kinds of sweets, 1 bottle of Bint al-Sudan, and 1 bottle of sandaliyya perfume. These are "the things for the incense" (al-hāyāt lil-bakhūr). They are also often brought as gifts at births, circumcisions, and weddings. The patient stays in the tumbura room for 7 days, during which they are considered both dangerous and especially vulnerable to jinn, evil eye, and sorcery. As such, the whole process is private, with no large gatherings. Only the shaykha and jalīsa are to enter the tumbura room and care for the patients. The rabāba is stored near the head of their bed. They are given medicine and fumigated with incense every morning and evening. The incense and medicine are stored near the rabāba, the medications being powder that is applied to the body, or mixed with water and drunk. After the medication is used, the incense burner is pressed three times to the top of the patient's head and each shoulder. More incense is applied to the patient's hands and feet, and inhaled by the patient three times. The incense used corresponds to a khayt; this is repeated for each khayt, if there are multiple. The medicine treats biological symptoms, and not the spiritual cause, and itself is enabled to work by incense placating the spirit. The process cures symptoms and changes relations between the patient and spirit.

The patient, during this time, keeps a strict diet (no "food with a soul"- a restriction also observed in Coptic fasts- and no salt), and a safety amulet on their person. This amulet is called an amāna, and consists of a medium-sized knife with an ebony handle, a foot-long piece of wood decorated with beads, and a bundle of straw, all tied together with cloth or rope. It has no equivalent in other Sudanese possession rites. Some patients may hold a whip during this time instead.

The thanksgiving ceremony (gadah al-bayād, which translates to something like "bowl of purity" in context, also called taṣbīra, meaning appetizer, though this also refers to a lesser version of the kursī rite where birds are sacrificed instead of a sheep) is 2 or occasionally 3 days, marking the end of seclusion and start of initiation. It starts Thursday afternoon and goes into late Friday evening. If it is not performed and thanks is not given to al-Jilanī, the zār affliction will return. In the past, it was held immediately after therapy, but due to economic strain, it may now be put off for up to two years. It is generally held as soon as possible. The ceremony is likened to a door one must open to reach kursī (initiation), and is a turning point where the group beings are emphasized over the patient. During the gadah al-bayād, one applies henna, the tatrīq is recited, 'asīda porridge is offered and pigeons are sacrificed for al-Jilanī.

The opening rite for gadah al-bayād, kursī, and all tumbura ceremonies is laylat al-hinna (the night of the henna). Upon arrival at the shaykha's house, the patient gives items considered necessary for the gadah al-bayād, which are kept on a large copper tray (ṣiniyya) set on the rabāba's left in the tumbura room until needed. The items include: 7 candles, 2-3 handfuls of dates and ground nuts, 3 types of sweets (mints, candies, and halāwa sa'd), 1 pack of cigarettes, 1 pack of matches, 6 teacups, 6 coffee cups, 1 bottle of Bint al-Sudan perfume, 1 bottle of mahlabiyya perfume, 1 bottle of suratiyya perfume, and one bottle of majmū'a perfume. If the patient is only able to provide some of these items, the shaykha will provide the rest. Notably, the last three perfumes are all used at weddings. To start, the former patient, sanjak, shaykha, and devotees gather in the tumbura room. The sanjak plays the tahlīl while the former patient sits in front of him, and the shaykha mixes up fresh henna paste on a white plate and sticks the candles in it while everyone sings. The henna is given to the 'idda, the hands and feet of the former patient, and then everyone else. A jirtiq bracelet is put on the former patient's right wrist. The former patient now temporarily secludes in the tumbura room. This entire process temporarily transforms the former patient into a bride, or at least a bride-like figure.

The morning after laylat al-hinna is typically uneventful. In the afternoon the pigeons are brought over, washed, and have incense applied. The maydān is set up, the flags stood up, a tray of coffee and tea cups, bowls of 'asīda or luqma, plates of rōb (sour milk), samna (clarified animal fat), suksukāniyya (boiled sorghum), and shariyya (pasta with sugar and tomato sauce). The "bride" bathes and changes into a white jalabiya. The hārasān sticks, Y-shaped sha'ba sticks of al-Jilani, and incense burner are brought out. Everything is placed near the rabāba. The sanjak gets into position, and the "bride" sits on front of him, covered in a white tob. The rest of the group stands around them with their hands close together, palm facing palm at chest level. The brigdar holds the sha'ba stick in his right hand (he does not speak unless holding one) and recites the tatrīq while the sanjak plays the tahlīl. If no brigdar is available, this duty falls to the shaykha.

The tatrīq is a short piece with a few different versions for different occasions, at most being 25 lines. Supposedly it was once longer. It functions as a way for the group to declare intent to do an important ritual and ask the presiding sanjak permission to proceed. It is recited at the start of all ceremonies and Friday sacrifices. Always the same is an invocation of Muhammad and his relatives, Bilal, the walis Abu Sa'biyya and Abu 'Amsa, Hawa and Adam, the living and dead, the known and unknown, the "lady of the 'idda" and her assistants. At the gadah al-bayād, the patient is mentioned, it is explained they've suffered, the group is curing them, the kursī is promised to occur, and permission to sacrifice is asked. At kursī, the patient is instead called a bride, their offerings are mentioned (the sheep, coffee, henna, and balīla), and it asked if these are accepted. At annual ceremonies it states the group has paid for the ceremony and brought offerings as the will of God, asks God to keep them healthy and together, and asks permission to sacrifice. The tatrīq provides continuity with Sufi Islam by mentioning conventional figures alongside tumbura figures. It emphasizes its adherents' humanity (who, being of slave descent, have often been regarded as subhuman) by linking them to Adam, Eve, and Mohammed. It also involves the whole group in the ceremony. The zār spirit is not mentioned in the recitation.

After the recitation of tatrīq, the highest ranking shaykha and brigdar set the bowl of asīda on the "bride's" head. The brigdar takes some asīda on his right forefinger and smears it on the 'idda seven times. The bowl is then put on the bride's knees, and the shaykha reaches under the tob to give them 3 mouthfuls to eat. She pours tea and coffee into one cup for the bride to drink. The pigeons are now brought out. One is rubbed on the bride's head and set free- it takes the illness away, and whoever catches it will be lucky. The brigdar asks permission of the group three times and slaughters the others: three pigeons on the bride's head, two on their knees, and two near the flags. The pigeons (which are considered a clean animal) are not considered a sacrifice, and less important than the one that is released and the eating of asīda, which is the thanksgiving offering. Their slaughter signifies something old ending and something new beginning. The whole gadah al-bayād is an anticipatory threshold event.'

The blood of pigeons is collected in a plate with a dibla- a silver ring tied to a red cotton string. Some Bint al-Sudan perfume is added to the blood. Once the dibla is on the bride's neck, the shaykha uncovers them, grabs their hands, and makes her stand with three jumps to make the illness leave. The "bride" sits once more, without the tob on. The shaykha sprays everyone with water to cool them from the illness. Everyone eats the 'asīda and wipes their hands on the "bride". Tea and coffee are served, and the music and trances start. Those who collapse are covered with a white tob and fumigated with incense.

Kursī (which means chair, but probably didn't originally refer to that in context; the origin and meaning are unknown, but it may be translated as "enthronement") always starts on Thursday and lasts seven days. It is the longest and most complex ceremony. The laylat al-hinna is on Thursday, and is the same as before except the tray also includes four pieces of soap, two lit candles stuck in coffee cups, and should have twice the number of tea and coffee cups. Friday has the sheep sacrifice for al-Jilani. Saturday has the ritual "opening" of the sheep head and optional mayz ritual for Banda with a black goat sacrifice. Sunday is the ritual "opening" of the goat head, the optional mayz for the Khawājā, and sacrifice of a turkey. Nothing happens Monday or Tuesday. Wednesday has the bride's ritual bath in the river. The ritual symbolism of the kursī presents the initiate as a bride, a woman having sex, a birthing mother, and a newborn simultaneously. Kursī only occurs once- similar private rituals are considered optional vow renewals or thanksgiving ceremonies dedicated directly to al-Jilani. Kursī by the 1980s had become more of an optional ritual, while gadah al-bayād remains necessary.

Friday is the day of the ritual procession and sacrifice for al-Jilani, which happen in the open. People eat first, and the ceremony starts around 5pm. Ideally everyone wears white, which is al-Jilani's color. The zaffa (procession) is first, with the shaykha and jalīsa escorting the initiate out of the tumbura room to sit in front of the sanjak as the tahlīl is played. The shaykha and brigdar present the al-Jilani and Bilal flags to the sanjak, and the procession starts. It is a counterclockwise half walk-half dance around the maydān while the sanjak plays zaffa songs. People stand on the sides and play kashākīsh rattles and drums, and most ritual items are carried. The novice initiate wears white tob and garmasīs (bridal veil) while carrying an amāna. The shaykha wears a white dress, tob, and Banda's beaded accessories. The procession goes until the sanjak finishes playing. Much of this is similar to the three annual Sufi zaffas- those and the tumbura's three annual zaffas ceased to be public due to a government ban in the 1960s.

One of the songs (sha'yan li'llah) is from the Mirghaniyya order. Some members of this order are mentioned in song during the procession, and the ritual tea and coffee services are held in honor of Muhammad al-Hassan (born al-Mīrghanī). Notably, this order was anti-Mahdist, a sentiment shared by tumbura members, due to the Mahdists being pro-slavery. The zaffa songs also invoke Mohammed, Bilal, other Sufi figures, mermaids, and river angels. The last two are associated with the Gumuz khayt, and with childbirth.

After eight songs (leaving only Bilal's to be done), the brigdar shouts everyone to a halt. Everyone assumes the posture taken during the tahlīl at the gadah al-bayād, and the tahlīl is played. The brigdar stands before the sanjak, holding the sha'ba in his right hand and a smoking incense burner in his left as he recites the tatrīq. The sheep, covered in white cloth, is brought forth. Drums are occasionally beaten like applause during this. After this is done, the al-Jilani and Bilal flags are returned to their usual position and the animal is brought in front of them. The cloth is removed, and the brigdar washes its mouth, belly, and genitals with water. The shaykha applies incense to it. The brigdar then lifts the animal into the air three times, throws it to the ground on its left side. It is immobilized, and the shaykha digs a hole under its neck. A plate with two rings, some perfume, and a few grains of coffee is put in the hole to collect blood. The brigdar slaughters sheep without saying "in the name of God". The plate is taken to the bride as the sha'yan li'llah plays, and the shaykha kneels on their left. She uncovers their face and anoints the forehead, temples, throat, both sides of the hands, and the soles of the feet. The remaining blood is licked off her fingers by the bride. The shaykha puts the rings on the bride's right hand, and puts the incense burner on their head, right shoulder, left shoulder, and the rest of the body. The bride drinks a mixture of tea and coffee, and the shaykha thrice splatters water onto the bride's face. The jalīsa takes the bride to the tumbura room where she stays until Wednesday, the final day of the kursī, and the person is now the child of the tumbura/'idda. The sanjak then plays the khayt songs and people dance. Some dance on their knees, covered with a tob, and some dance standing without one. People near the dancers undo their hair. When the shaykha dances, the others stand out of respect. The hārasān stick is held in front of her, and the jalīsa applies incense to the rabāba. Food may be brought out near the end of the ceremony.

The opening of the head occurs the evening after the sacrifice (Saturday for al-Jilani). To prepare, the sheep is boiled. Its head and hip bones are put in a covered wooden bowl, and its genitals, upper chest, and neck bones are put in the other. These are considered a "complete" animal. These bowls, an incense burner, and a glass of milk are put on a mat. The novice initiate is covered with a white tob and marital cloth, and holds the amāna as they're brought from the tumbura room to sit before the sanjak. The sanjak plays tahlīl, and the brigdar recites the tatrīq while holding the sha'ba. The jalīsa stands next to the brigdar with a knife. Once tatrīq is finished, the bowl with the sheep head is put on the bride's head and has incense applied. The bowl is uncovered. The brigdar opens the sheep's mouth with a knife, then pours milk in it, a symbolic consummation of the marriage between novice and spirit. The brigdar cuts some tongue pieces and throws them towards the flags. He is also supposed to request the bride taste a piece of tongue. The sanjak plays khayt songs. The bowl is put on the bride's knees, then returned to mat. The novice dances, and then the jalīsa brings them a coffee and tea mixture to drink. The rabāba, hārasān, drums, and flags are anointed with coffee. The sanjak repeats tahlīl, and after the brigdar calls for a break. The bride is returned to the tumbura room, and everyone else dances.

Early Wednesday evening, the "bride" is brought out, and people make their way to the river. This procession was once on foot zaffa, just without flags, but the government ban means adherents proceed via a van. Sanjak still plays the rabāba as they ride, and everyone sings and plays kashākīsh rattles. Once there, the jalīsa leads the novice initiate into knee deep water and presents them to the sanjak and brigdar. The jalīsa goes further downstream, invokes the Nile spirits, and throws the remains of the ceremony in the water, particularly the bones. Simultaneously, the sanjak washes the "bride's" face with water three times. The brigdar has two white live chickens, and hands them to the sanjak one at a time. The sanjak submerged each chicken three times, and strokes it with the novice's back, chest, and shoulders three times. Everyone returns to the maydān, and the 'asīda offering is repeated, but with balīla instead. Tea and coffee are served, and the ritual paraphernalia is packed and returned to the tumbura room. The river ceremony is similar to local post partum rituals.

The maydān is set up the same way each time: the sanjak stands on the west side, the flags are set up on the east side, the female devotees stand on the north side, and the male devotees stand on the south side. The tumbura room is to the sanjak's right. Most of the ritual paraphernalia is placed near the flags or sanjak. Incense burns the whole time.

Once initiated, one is called son or daughter of tumbura or the son or daughter of the instruments/utensils ('idda, the ceremonial items of the cult, including musical instruments, flags, and ritual sticks). They may also address the shaykha and sanjak and mother and father, and the other adherents as their brothers and sisters, and behave accordingly during ceremonies.

Jawab songs are performed on the rabāba by the sanjak, with three or five nugāra drums (played by other tumbura officiants) and kashākīsh rattles (played by devotees) as accompaniment. Devotees respond to the nizūl jawabs of their khayt with trance and ecstatic dance. The other type of jawab, wanasa jawabs, are performed for entertainment, not to induce trance. During certain jawabs, devotees are commanded to stand by the sanjak, and two will stand on either side of him holding hārasān (wooden sticks covered in beads, considered guardians of the rabāba), and the shaykha holds up the smoking incense burner with her right hand.

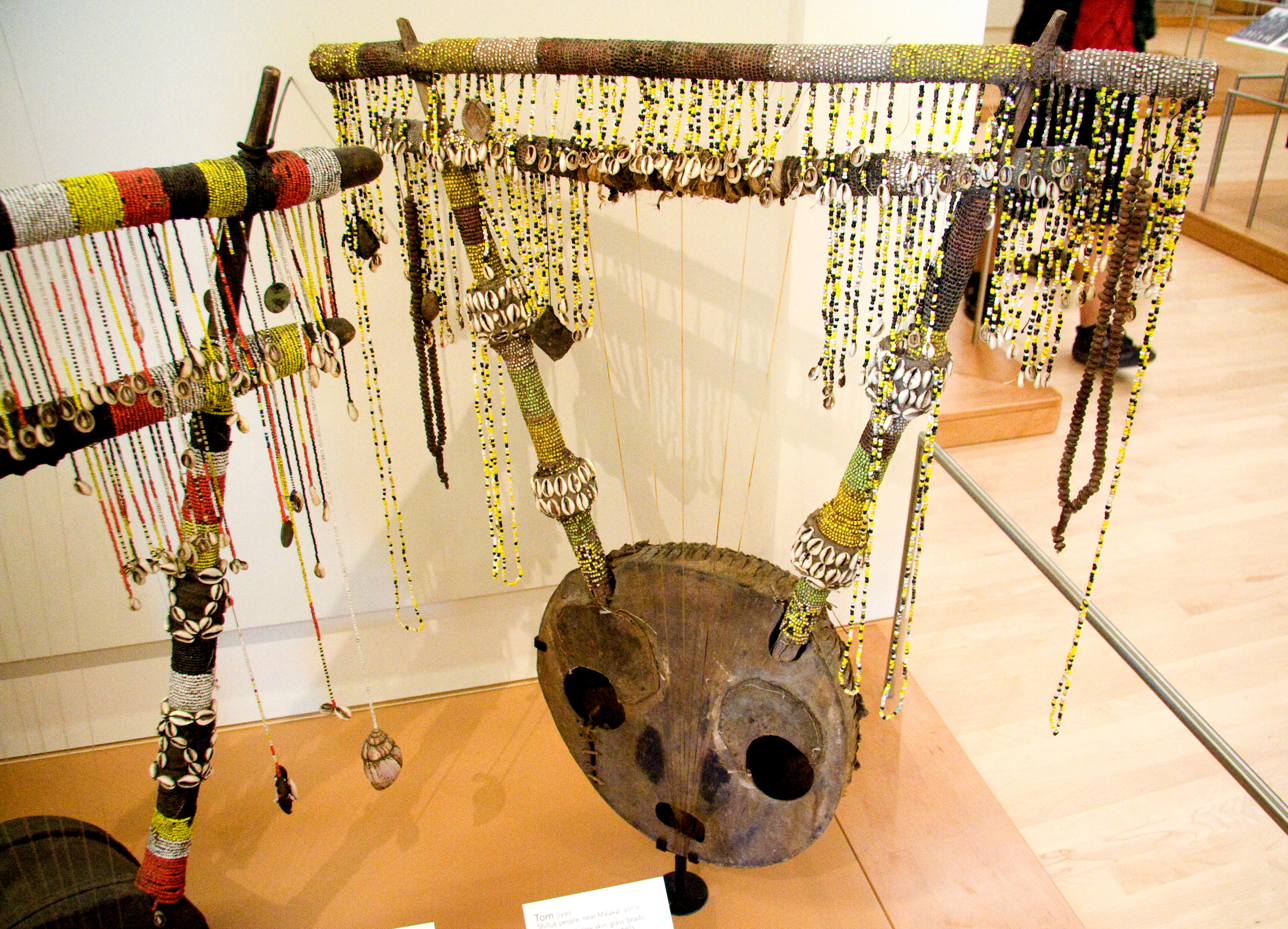
a Shilluk lyre

The tanbūra, or rabāba, is often important in zār rites as mentioned, and often the instruments would have individual names like people, and be passed down. Whoever had the instrument in their possession was its master and protector. The name for the zār tumbura may in fact, come from the instrument, and the version of the instrument used in proceedings resembles the rabāba found in the South and Nuba hills. The sanjak summons the zār spirit through his playing, and serves as a doorman between the human and spirit worlds, with the instrument as the door, and the songs he plays are the key. These songs are said to have been composed of past sanjaks. Faraj Allah al-Sanduli is believed to have been the first sanjak (simultaneously with, and separate from, Bilal's bringi sanjak role), said to have attracted a mermaid with his rabāba playing and to currently live among them. If someone falls unconscious due to the effect of the song of the tanbūra, they may be treated with balila, a kind of porridge. If they enter the ecstatic state, they may be covered with a cloth.

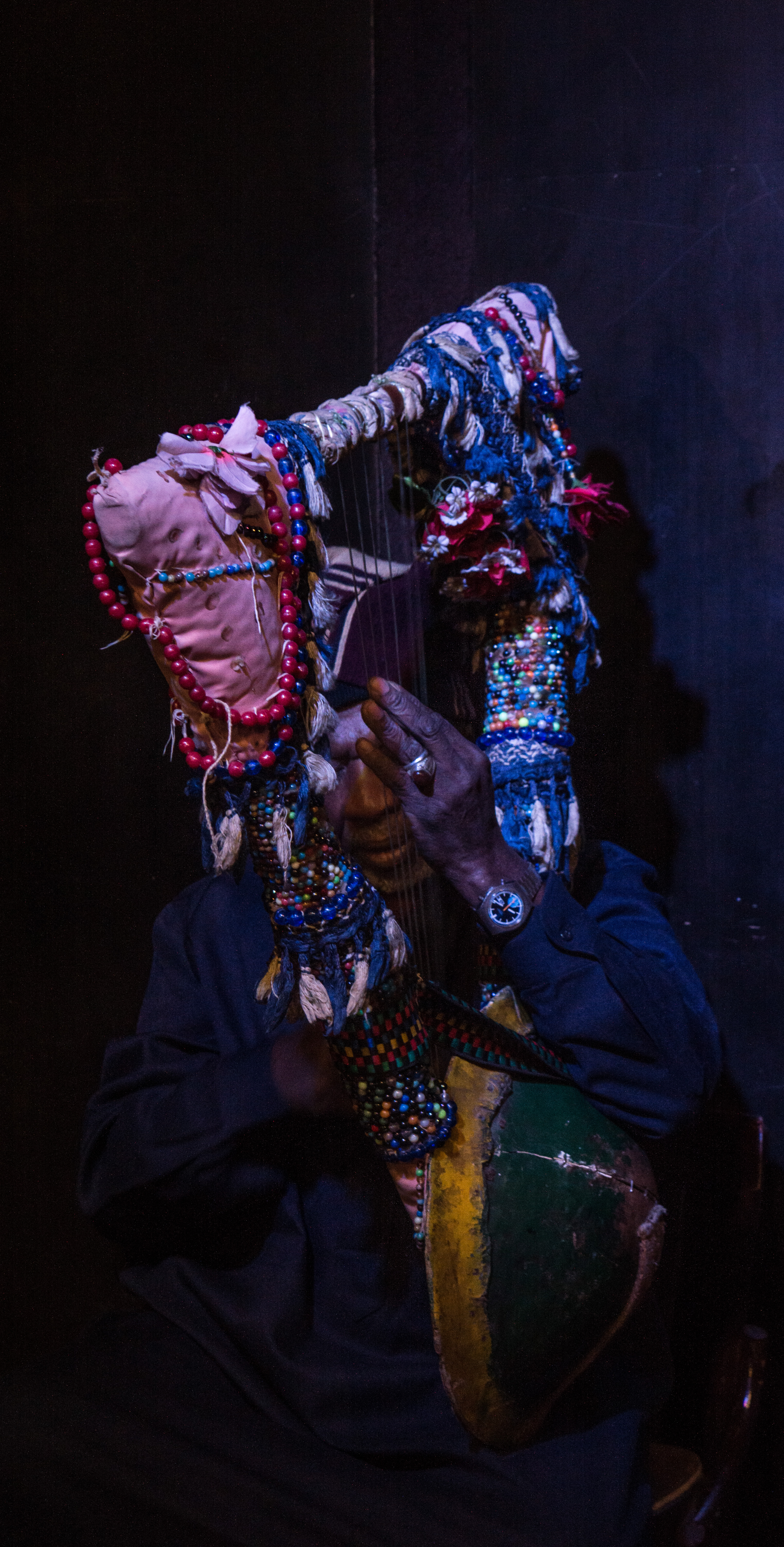
An Egyptian zār musician, likely of Sudanese descent, playing a tanbura.

At one point sanjaks operated in a healing capacity, especially in the hybrid role of shaykh-sanjak, but now this is more so the role of a shaykha. The sanjaks of old are also attributed magical powers, particularly power to harm others with "hot roots" from the South and the Blue Nile. Not everyone who plays tanbūra for the tumbura is a sanjak; some are brigdars (assistants to the sanjak). Technically, anyone who knows tumbura songs could become a sanjak, but in practice they usually must be "called" by the spirit, which happens in the form of a long ailment cured by tumbura. The term sanjak probably comes from a military title in the Turco-Egyptian army, the leader of a company of cavalry, as does brigdar (from baraq dar). Sanjaq is also what the Ottoman flag is called. The sanjak generally deals with matters of the public sphere, such as initiations of new members, installing new officants, and celebrating annual Islamic festivals, which shaykhas organize under the sanjak's authority. Unlike the shaykha, the sanjak exercises authority in multiple groups, and ultimately appoints all other roles in the zār tumbura. Because of this, the sanjak performing this role is called the guide (dalīl), which is also an army rank. If the dalīl isn't present at a ceremony, no other sanjak can play, and the dalīl is viewed as owning the rabābas the shaykha has in her house. There is a single dalīl in a group, though multiple sanjak may play at ceremonies. The shaykh-sanjak performed the role of the sanjak and the shaykha, doing music, healing, and divinations, and this role was more standard in the zār tumbura of Eastern Sudan. In Khartoum, those that acted as both were viewed with some suspicion. A sanjak, after acquiring the knowledge of a shaykha by proximity, could become a shaykh by sacrificing a bull. Today the sanjak role is greatly diminished in power due to tumbura overall declining and eroding the old social networks, and sanjaks may primarily be viewed as musicians.

The ceremony for a new sanjak would have the candidate seated while wearing a white jallabiyya and turban, with a green shawl (representing al-Jilanī) and a red shawl (representing Bilal) crossed over his chest. Behind him is the rabāba. The other sanjaks stand on either side of him. Behind the sanjaks stand the brigdars and sawatary. At the back are male devotees on the right, female on the left. All are facing Mecca, and the cult banners are in front of them. The dalīl of the house brings 7 trays of sweets, and gives the sanjaks one of each, then the new sanjak, then the male devotees. The ummiyya or jalīsa serves the women. The dalīl plays the tahīl (representing "there is no God but God"), and the brigdar recites the Fatiha before slaughtering a sheep for al-Jilanī.

The brigdar is responsible for putting the cult banners in the maydān, reciting the tatrīq and slaughtering, incense, the proper behavior of male devotees, serving coffee and tea, and music (by playing the kashākīsh rattle, the rabāba, the nugāra drum (sometimes with a piece of hippo leather), and/or singing, especially to give the sanjak a break). They are prohibited from sexual relations with those in the group. Brigdar are informally selected by the sanjak and taught to play rabāba, and once the sanjak is satisfied, he recites the tatrīq and slaughters a white sheep in the name of al-Jilanī for them. The brigdar wears a white jallabiyya and is anointed with blood from the sheep on the forehead, temples, throat, palms, and feet. A red (left to right) and a green (right to left) shawl are crossed over his chest. Brigdars usually do not have pedigree the way many sanjaks do. They are listened to, in a friendly way, especially during ceremonies, but not respected or feared as they once were, and there are few, if any, who still hold the role. The position is lifelong, but one may retire or become a sanjak.

The sawatary (or sawatarī) role no longer exists in practice. It is unknown where the word comes from. When it did, the sawatary would hold the flag of Bilal during officant installations, reciting the tatrīq, and during ceremonial processions, and assist the brigdar. The muttarīq role (a specific reciter for the tatrīq) also no longer exists.

When an initiate visits and seeks the advice of a shaykha, they go to the "tumbura room" (the home of the shaykha itself is "the tumbura house" and is where ceremonies are performed and paraphernalia is kept). Other guests and initiates would gather there as well, and the shaykha would use incense to enter an ecstatic trance state (called nazla, nazal, or kashif), and assume the voice of her possessing spirit to talk to those in the room. This possession state is not total; the shaykha may, for example, speak as herself to clarify something the spirit said, then continue speaking as the spirit. Others in the room may chime in with their opinion. This state allows the shaykha to diagnose, and the ailment may not necessarily be possession. Magic and the evil eye may also fall under the shaykha's ability to treat, usually with incense, counter work with roots, and written spells or charms hidden in the patient's home. However the claimed ability to treat these, which fall outside the realm of zār, may be just a way of emphasizing a shaykha's power, and not done in practice. The shaykha generally deals with matters of the private sphere, such as treating patients, day-to-day running of the group, and ceremonies celebrated by individual devotees. She is responsible for the costumes and objects of the spirit, the order in which songs are sung, and which incense should be used.

To become a tumbura shaykha, one would first become a primary assistant (jalīsa) of the shaykha that healed them. They keep the incense burner going during ceremonies and take care of the women at them, as well as assisting the shaykha with patients. They would then either wait to be appointed upon the shaykha's retirement as successor (in which case they inherit the previous shaykha's rabāba/tanbūra), or try to establish themself somewhere else. A jalīsa may not be eager to take up the role of shaykha upon appointment. Trying to establish oneself without appointment is often presented as an order from the spirit, but may also stem from other motivations such as envy, conflict with the group, or ambition. In the latter case one would either take one of the rabāba from the group (the more prestigious option, as it represents a continuity of power and the instrument itself is generally thought of as more powerful), or; if the group only has one, the prospective shaykha is acting without permission, or she cannot have one of the rabāba for geographic reasons, a new one would be made. The group the aspiring shaykha is from must accept her, as well as the leadership across the region. If unanimous acceptance doesn't occur, those who do not accept will not recognize the new shaykha, and may cut ties with those who accepted her. In the case of succession, the new shaykha cannot seek the advice of the former shaykha. The establishment of a new shaykha is commemorated with the thanksgiving ceremony, a procession outside the house, the kursī, and the "opening of the head" (fatah al-ras) ceremony, which is part of the kursī. A belt is put on the new shaykha, and saying "they put a belt around me" is an idiom referring to the appointment.

Other official roles a woman may have include that of gerāyya (one who runs), which is more minor. It is essentially a messenger role, where she informs other group members of ceremonies and other events. The now defunct role wagiba was the assistant of the jalīsa. The habbōba al-kānūn (grandmother of the stove) prepared food and sometimes beer for the ceremonies.

Sanjaks often nominated their wives as shaykha, and shaykhas generally say their relatives were themselves shaykhas or sanjaks. This is also true for sanjaks. This is for two reasons: one, if they're being truthful, they grew up around the zār tumbura and are familiar with it. Second, this pedigree confers a high status, and therefore some lie about this to elevate their standing. Like the sanjak, the rabāba/tanbūra is important to the shaykha; she will possess at least one.

In Port Sudan and other parts of Eastern Sudan the roles and leadership structure for tumbura are slightly different. There, the shaykh is the leader who performs healing functions; there are few, if any, shaykha. The sanjak is only the musical assistant of the shaykh, and is appointed by the shaykh.

The affliction in the tumbura context, is connected to the subjugated status of practitioners (being of slave descent) and the healing relies on a positive alternative identity that negates that status.

Today, zār tumbura groups have become more isolated and independent from each other (as zār bori groups are) due to a decline in new initiates, and many groups ceasing to exist. However, different groups still come together when a new high officant is appointed and during annual Islamic festivals.

==== Bori ====
For zār bori, a diagnosis of possession should be publicly affirmed before a curative rite occurs. The possessed may be informed of it while attempting previous treatments outside of zār, or they may be diagnosed by a sitt al-'ilba (lady of the box, referring to incense, who may also be a shaykha). The latter will take a piece of cloth that's had bodily contact with the possessed, and the possessed will also provide a coin, sweets, or perfume. The sitt will fumigate the items with spirit incense and chant a khayt that invokes all zār spirits collectively. The items are then put under the pillow, and dreams reveal the spirits and their demands. The sitt al-'ilba, or another experienced zār adherent, may also interpret the possessed dreams to find out this information.

On rare occasions, possession may be confirmed by spontaneous trance outside of a ceremony. A shaykha will be called to attend to the matter, and will either attempt to speak to the spirit, or judge its reactions to different incenses, a process which may take several days. Over time the spirit usually becomes more coherent and communicative, progressing from muteness, grunts, and rotana to speaking Arabic.

If this does not work, the shaykha may call for a trial (tajruba), three nights of drumming where khayts are performed. This is a condensed healing ceremony where incenses and colognes are used, and spirit paraphernalia is made available for the possessed to interact with. Usually, the spirit reveals itself, but if it does not, zār possession is not necessarily ruled out.

It is necessary that the possessed accept the diagnosis, though resistance to the idea at first helps ensure others see them as genuine. Once the possessed has accepted the diagnosis, she agrees to at some point hold a ceremony once she can afford it. Her husband and male relatives may help her gather the funds for this. The first zār is more expensive than any subsequent ones. The usual items needed for a zār ceremony include incense, cologne, cigarettes, alcohol (especially beer), a sacrificial animal, and any specific demands of the spirit. In rural areas, it is polite for other attendees to help offset costs by bringing small gifts.

The zār ceremony lasts 1, 3, 5, or 7 days, during which the possessed is referred to as the bride of the zār, and does not interact with anyone outside the ceremony. Unless her husband is also possessed, she must avoid him. She must abstain from sex and physical labour- others help her by doing her household tasks instead. She does not leave her house until the procession to the Nile.

Ceremonies for zār bori should ideally take place in a house (particularly that of the possessed who commissioned it or the shaykha), but may be held outdoors if the heat is unbearable. proceedings usually start in the late afternoon and continue into the night and early morning. There is a break during sunset to avoid attracting malicious spirits that are active around that time. Ceremonies are not held during Ramadan, as Allah prevents the zār from bothering people then, and spirit incense may not be used. When outside, it usually takes place in a courtyard still inside the home. The participants gather in a U-shaped midān, with the opening oriented towards the primary door. The ceremonies are conducted by a shaykha, who plays a drum. The central patient sits on a pillow or mat next to the musicians with the shaykha at her right, facing either east towards Mecca, or towards the men's entrance of the home. Once everyone is present, a censer is passed around for participants to fumigate their orifices with.

Drumming starts as blessings are requested from Muhammad and some Sufi saints, then music is played to bring forth the zār spirits, which is responded to with dance, possession trance, and movement. Others who are possessed dance (nazal) as well during proceedings. Those who stand and exhibit characteristics of their spirits during the rites have sacrificed for their spirits, while those who sit or kneel have not, though they may know which spirit types afflict them. The dancing and possession usually ceases when the spirit's song does. If it does not, the shaykha tries to talk to it and ask its demands, and bargain if they are excessive. At some point before the final day the central "bride" becomes possessed, and the spirit or spirits possessing her have their identity fully confirmed, which enables communication and healing. Dancing occurs almost non-stop, with breaks to sleep, and for women to ensure their children are fed.

On the final day of the ceremony, the sacrificial animal (a sheep or goat with color and markings associated with the spirit or class of spirits) which has been washed and made up with henna on its head and back is brought in. It is covered with a red and gold bridal shawl (garmosīs or garmasis), while music is played and an incense brazier is placed underneath the shawl to fumigate the animal. If the animal bobs its head (as a possessed woman does) this is taken as a sign the spirit accepts the transaction. The animal also must inhale the smoke; after this, it is slaughtered, with some of the blood collected in a bowl and placed in front of the drums. The primary patient steps over the carcass 7 times before it is taken away for butchery, often by the only adult man in attendance. He holds a coin in his mouth to prevent him from saying bismallah, which might frighten the spirits and cause them to flee. Others at the zār place coins in the bowl of blood. Those who are possessed are anointed with blood, with the bride going first, and some may even drink it. Attention in anointing is paid to the primary patient's feet and arms. Dancing continues after this until the sacrificial meal (typically fattah, which is also made during a public sacrificial meal thanking God for good fortune) is ready, which is the completion of recovery. The ceremony soon ends, and the next day the primary patient will eat the head meat of the sacrifice in a private ceremony and have a procession to the Nile.

During this next day ceremony, "the opening of the head" (fakka-t-ar-rās), the head is boiled the night before, and held on a tray above the patient's head. The shaykha opens the patient's mouth and makes her eat, especially the brain and sensory organs (except for the eyes). The Nile procession then occurs, with the bones, blood bowl, and some sweets being carried in a basket. The shaykha and "bride" enter the water and wash. The contents of the basket are released in the water, and the bowl is rinsed. The "bride" returns home, changes clothes, puts on perfume, goes into a room she hasn't occupied for the past few days, and is fumigated with incense once more. She avoids her husband for one more week, and from now on does daily "work" for her spirit(s).

If the patient is sufficiently wealthy and possessed by a Khawājā spirit, she may hold a ceremony called a mayz. A long table is set up, with a tablecloth and European cutlery, and set with food the Khawājāt enjoy, such as various alcohols, Western soda, olives, expensive fruit, tinned fish and sausage, Danish cheese, tea biscuits, and French bread. Tall backed chairs are around the table for the hosts of the Khawājāt to sit and eat, or the whole thing may be done buffet-style.

The musicians at ceremonies are devotees, never outsider professionals. The order the khayts are played in to summon the spirits is usually as follows: first are the Darāwīsh (Holy people), second are the Ethiopians (Habīsh), third are the foreigners (Khawājāt; Europeans, North Americans, Hindus, and Chinese spirits), fourth are the Egyptian, Turkish, and British colonial officials (Bashawāt), fifth are the desert nomads ('Arāb), sixth are the Syrian tinkers and Domari (Halib), seventh are West Africans and west Sudanese (Fallata), and eighth are South Sudanese and other Black Africans (called 'Abid, which is offensive, or Zirug, or Khudām). This order is also the order of drum rhythms from "light" to "heavy". The female spirits are sometimes drummed separately, as their own group. When this happens, they come last. The khayt are played even if no known hosts are present for the relevant spirit, as a host may or may not be revealed at a ceremony. Even if there are known hosts at a ceremony, a spirit may not descend in response to their khayt. Sometimes this is because the host(s) in question are menstruating, and sometimes there is no clear reason at all.

If it is a woman's first zār, she is dressed in white. In general, the possessed generally wears a jalabiya, with a red belt around their waist, and two red sashes crossed over the chest. This is because sometimes in the zār bori, as in the tumbura, zār spirits are called "red winds", as opposed to the more malicious "black" spirits.

Zār bori ceremonies draw on the symbolism of weddings, though they are not, themselves, thought of as weddings. Both last either 7 or 3 days. Small gifts of money are collected from guests. Incense fumigations are done. Music and dance feature. Animals are sacrificed and processions to the Nile are held. There is a period of separation, margin and transition, and reaggregation. Doorways, orifices, fluids, grain, blood, and gold are all significant to both. "Brides" in both are forbidden to do chores, will wear white and red (bridal colors), use wedding paraphernalia, and follow wedding hygiene. The gifts demanded by spirits are also similar to a bride's. Opening rites occur, signifying the start of a relationship (husband and wife, spirit and host). Idioms and symbols associated with both are similar. The sacrificial animal is also adorned like a bride. The emphasis of this similarity varies by region- urban zār bori rites typically resemble Sufi remembrance ceremonies (zikr). Even in urban rites, however, there are resonant symbols (for example, a handkerchief dipped in sacrificial blood and worn around the wrist by patients, which is suggestive of the harīra bracelet worn at weddings).

To coax a zār spirit to reveal itself, the possessed may be offered money, have the shaykha blow in their ears and on their neck, be lightly beaten with rope or an iron spear (not enough to really cause injury), censed with incense, picked up by the shaykha as she dances, and so on.

The shaykha attains her position and knowledge by apprenticing to an existing shaykha, often a maternal female relative. The title is gradually bestowed by community perception of her abilities.

Urban zār bori professionals may run "clinics" where zār patients can stay during treatment, and sell spirit paraphernalia. Urban professionals are more jealous and territorial than rural ones, and rural professionals only are paid with small voluntary donations. Zār bori groups are often organized autonomously, with some being linked by a founding "grandmother" or Al-Shibba (house-post), but still functioning independently of each other.

Transvestite individuals participate in zār bori rites, as well as homosexual men, including in leadership positions.

==== Sennar ====
Sennar zār has elements of both tumbura and bori.

In Sennar, the ceremonies include the jabana, an informal coffee party which is held frequently. Spirits (usually Ethiopians) are summoned with coffee and incense to advise and entertain adherents. It has become popular and frequent in large part because it is less expensive than a formal ceremony. Another ceremony is the al-Kursi, a healing ceremony that invites all spirits to visit. It is resource intensive, but seen as the only way of easing severe zār affliction. It establishes communication and a relationship between human and spirit. The seven groups of spirits are summoned in the order of Darawish, Pashawat, Khawajat, Habashi, nas Arab, and finally nas Zirug. Typically at least one sacrifice occurs, but details vary based on which spirit is connected to the primary patient. Another is the Karama, which is hosted by zār leaders with the support of their followers. The most important of these are held before Ramadan (a time of inactivity for spirits), during Rajab. It is communal, and during Rajab it celebrates and renews the human-spirit relationship. Zar and Sufi adherents both place a great deal of importance on the month of Rajab. Ceremonies and all-night prayers may happen daily, or almost daily, in the month. These ceremonies reaffirm the bond between spirits and humans. The most important day is the 27th, when Mohammed's night journey is said to have occurred. Only the most important zar leaders hold ceremonies on that day.

The concept of karamat, usually analogous to "miracles", is used in Sennar zār to express the concept of showing everyday generosity towards others, and may be offered to the spirits or to the house of zar itself.

"Mayenga" is used in Sennar zār to mean a shrine.

==== Other ====
The dinia, the possession rite of the Nuba hills before tumbura, involved making marisa beer and balila, slaughtering, and circumambulating a large tree in the countryside three times. The patient would be bathed in the morning, and effigies of various animals would be made of mud. They take these and an egg to a place with cultivated land and put the animal effigies down in a specific order. They'd go back to the tree, have the patient circumambulate three times, bathe again, then smear the egg over the body from the neck to the toes. The patient would throw the effigies at the tree, and then everyone would run away back to the village without looking back. It is no longer practiced, having been replaced by tumbura.

=== Yemen ===
In Aden, both zār bori and tumbura were extant and considered distinct, with the latter being male dominant and tied closely to saint-veneration. In the 1920s, both groups began denying their religious and spiritual nature in response to being targeted by religious reformers.

In Aden's zār bori (locally often just called zār), groups were led by women called the 'Alaka. Most of their devotees were women, but the musicians tended to be men. Regular participants were usually Ethiopian and Somali, but all sectors of Adeni society sought out zār when needed. The ceremonies could be semi-public and held on common ground, or held in the privacy of the home. Placation offerings included perfume, jewelry, and sacrifices. It did not use Sufi imagery (such as flags) or have a connection to Sufi saints as zār bori in Sudan and zār in Egypt sometimes do.

Aden's tumbura leaders were typically male and were called Akils. Adeni tumbura had weekly ceremonies, usually on Thursdays or Saturday, a ceremonies held during the ziyarat (annual festivals). It was connected to saints, who arguably were given the role of ancestor, and their tombs.

== Paraphernalia ==
Zār adherents often signify their affiliation with a piece of jewelry. Music is central to many zār practices as well, and the instruments used in zār may be highly decorated and regarded. Incense is also typically given a high degree of importance. Special clothes, jewelry, accessories, and other items are often purchased to appease the spirits. The colors white, red, and green are commonly significant.

In Bahrain, zār adherents historically sometimes signaled their affiliation by wearing a ring with their name, the name of their possessing spirit, and the shahada engraved onto a red stone. The ring is bathed in blood before it is worn.

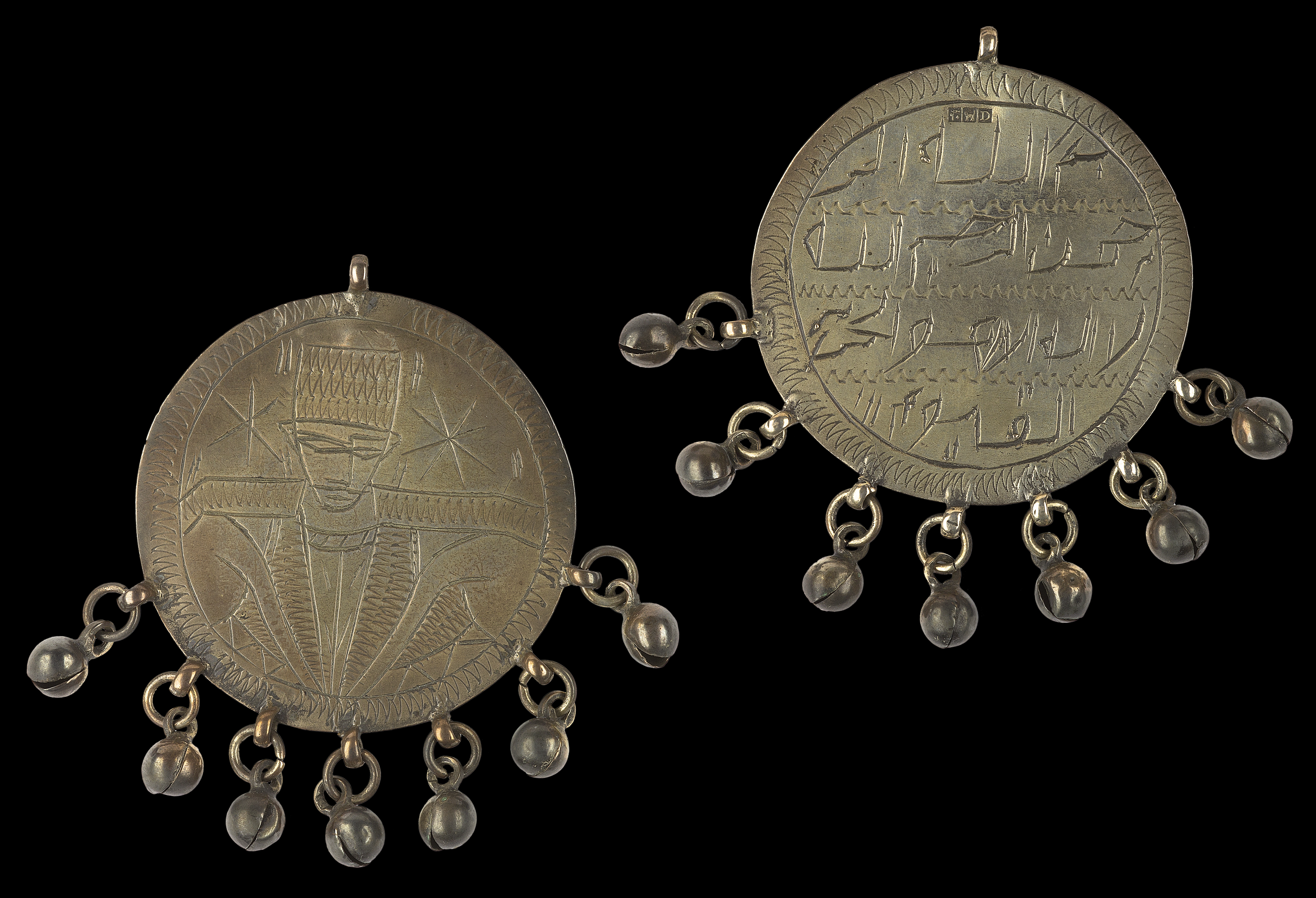

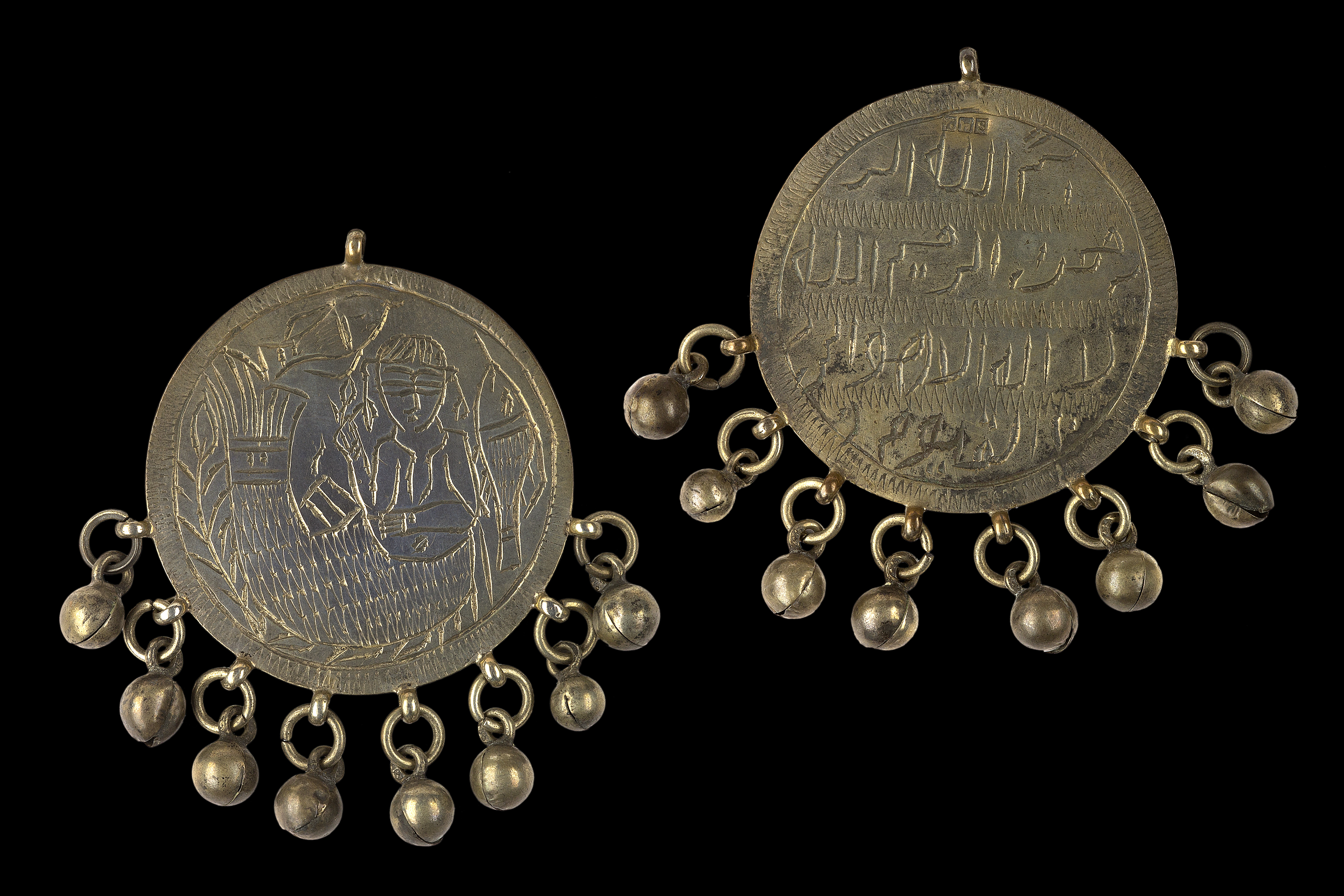

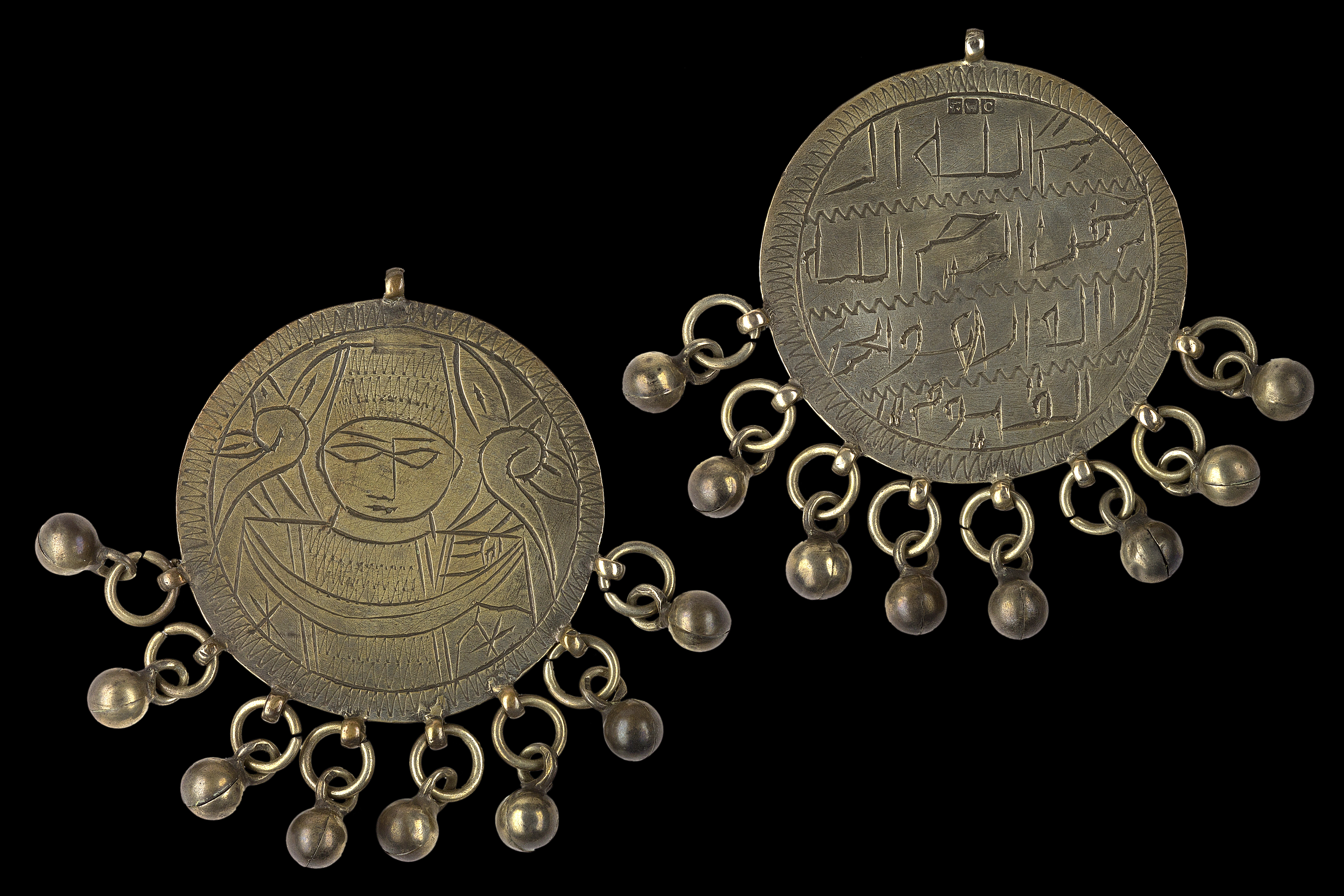
Silver Egyptian pendants, likely made for zār

Jewelry is important in the Egyptian zār. Even if an initiate ceases going to zārs, they keep their jewelry for the rest of their life, so they don't offend the spirits. The jewelry, as well as the initiate's body, is anointed with sacrificial animal blood upon initiation, and re-anointed periodically, signifying the contract they have with the spirits. For this reason, initiates may be called mitzaffar or mitzaffara (anointed with the blood of sacrificial animals). The jewelry and amulets are re-anointed with blood at every zār ceremony. It is most commonly silver, with bells in odd numbers, and often adorned with incised images of specific spirits, either by themselves or in pairs. The jingles are indicative an item was used for zār. Different regions of Egypt had different styles for making zār jewelry, with the incised depictions of spirits being common in Alexandria and Cairo, while Upper Egyptian amulets tended to have abstract designs. These regional styles may not be obvious to an observer. Indeed, whether or not a piece of jewelry was made for zar may not be visually obvious at all. It is often called fadat al-me'affrateen (silver of the possessed).

The most iconic piece of jewelry from Egyptian zār are the objects with spirit images, particularly pendants. This type of zar jewelry was mainly produced between 1900 and 1980 in Egypt. It was used by women of the zar community, and sometimes constituted a "barrier" of sorts, between the self and the outside world. Silver is most common mainly because of the expense; wealthier people commissioned some gold pieces. In the family of African possession cults, or adorcist rites, only Egyptian zar uses spirit images on jewelry (others present images on banners, in drawings, etc., or occasionally spirit names on jewelry). This use of images is part of zār's role as a historical record, much like the songs and the spirits themselves. This memory evolves, as a key part of its purpose is to express a collective identity. Pieces of zar jewelry with a spirit image will have the image on one side, and the Throne verse of the Quran on the other. The side with the Throne verse is what would be flipped to be visible while wearing. Amulets with the Throne verse on both sides are used in zār, but are also used in other circumstances.

One of the most common amulets is the "heart" (qalb), either shaped like a tablet or framed heart, made of glass, plastic, or semiprecious stone. Many amulets are also inscribed with the throne verse from the Qur’an, or other Islamic phrases. Zar jewelry in Arabic has been called higab (generic: amulet), higab qalb (heart amulet), hafessa, and simply sigha (jewelry).

The first piece of jewelry zār devotees get is a silver coin, often made into a pendant, symbolizing the contract between person and spirit. This coin was used in the diagnosis process. It is often a pillar coin- a silver Spanish coin depicting the pillars of Hercules. This image is interpreted by Egyptians to be a cannon, which is made of iron. Iron is useful for defending oneself from jinn, so the image of something made of iron has resonances when dealing with spirits. This image is important enough that some writers allege imitation coins were made specially for zār.

Zār jewelry may be kept in a special box. Pieces are often selected by the possessed going into trance and picking those they have seen in dreams or visions. While initiates are often Muslims, the silversmiths are often Coptic Christians. Zar jewelry, as well as the incense, music played, colors used, and venue chosen, serves a dual function of inviting zār spirits while warding away other spirits that may be dangerous. What zār spirits like may be disliked by jinn (for example, zār spirits like cleanliness and incense), or may be combined with things they dislike (including music dedicated to the Prophet and saints alongside the zār songs, or having jewelry that uses colors and images the zār like alongside elements that drive away jinn).

Other, less common mediums for jewelry are beadwork. The takiet kharz is a headdress made of beads and cowrie shells, with a fringe six inches wide and three tassels. It often has a matching belt, sometimes of beads mounted on a base. The amulets may also be made of beadwork. Winifred Blackman had a set of green and white zār beadwork from Upper Egypt consisting of a belt, cap, amulet, and necklace. Mention has also been made of sacrificial animals having jewelry: such as a forehead piece made of two two-foot-long palm sticks, bound in a T cross and decorated with tinsel and paper, and a staff 42 inches long decorated with beads in brown, white, green, red, and three bands of cowrie shells equidistant from each other, which is used while riding the sacrificial animal. Many zār devotees also had special sticks for ceremonies, and had bath and perfume zār paraphernalia, and some zār leaders keep costumes on hand for use at hadras that correspond to certain spirits.

Sudanese zār tumbura adherents may wear an item called a "tumbura ring" as a necklace pendant. It may also be called a dibla. The dibla is worn around the neck by adherents for the rest of their life at the behest of the angels who follow al-Jilani.

To make a new rabāba, a tumbura devotee takes two wooden bowls (of appropriate shape and material), applies incense to them, and sacrifices pigeons. The bowls would be buried for 40 days, and guests would come and sleep on the ground near where they were buried. The new rabābas (made from the buried bowls) would appear in the existing shaykha's dreams if it was God's will for there to be a new shaykha. Then an animal sacrifice would happen and the two bowls would be dug up. The prospective shaykha may take time off work to prepare for the rabāba construction ceremony. Another animal sacrifice occurs before the instruments enter the home of the shaykha. Further sacrifices occur in the case of both old and new rabābas in conjunction with new shaykhas being established.

In Sennar and among other zār bori practitioners, zar leaders hand down a tin box (al-'ilba) from one generation to the next, either in family lines or from master to apprentice. This contains their zār paraphernalia, as well as their knowledge and power. Each box is unique, with unique contents and histories, which speaks to and even epitomizes the varied and fluid nature of zār. When ritually opened (only done by the owner), the zār spirits are released/summoned. Trainee assistants of zār leaders start with small, unimpressive boxes, and gradually work up to a large tin box.

Among the instruments played at the Sudanese zār bori there is the dallūka, an earthenware drum with a goat hide head; the nugarishan, a brass mortar that rings when struck, similar to a cowbell with a deeper sound; as well as re-use of items like washtubs.

The basic zār incense (Bakhur az-zār) in bori consists of 'uda (brownish red wood), yellow mastic resin (lubān mistīka, Pistacia lentiscus), and a sprinkle of bottled cologne. Other ingredients are added to create specific types of zār incense: for example, one adds frankensence to make the Khawājāt's incense.

The zār bori does not seem to typically use cult banners as the tumbura does, though two written accounts include them. They may be an item associated more so with urban zār bori groups, which are more formal, more organized, and run by well paid male and female professionals.

== Perception ==
Outsiders in Egypt, Iran, and Sudan tend to view zār negatively, with some seeing it as an un-Islamic practice. Zār practitioners view outsiders in various ways, with some being wary, especially of journalists, and others being glad that their practices are being written down.

=== Egypt ===
In the 19th century the Egyptian government tried to ban zār, but it was common by the 1860s in all classes of women.

Egyptian movies have provided an influential way for Egyptians to engage with, and understand their culture. Egyptian movies have overall shown zār as superstitious, backwards, and outdated. Zār practitioners have been shown as scammers. This has caused many young Egyptians to feel shame around zār. However, a few movies have portrayed zār respectfully, and been enjoyed by real-life devotees. Zār is also characterized as satanic or frightening by outsiders.

Zār itself is not currently illegal, but things done during zār may be, such as smoking hashish. Noise complaints may also be filed and used against zār groups if they don't have a good relationship with their neighbors and local police.

Drummed zār and musical groups have declined, due in part to leaders not training the next generation in songs and how to do ceremonies. This is particularly notable among female leaders, and has led to men taking more leading and prominent roles.

Publicly, religious leaders generally take a stance against zār. In private however, their own family may be adherents.

=== Ethiopia ===
Many zar doctors have been respected for their abilities. However, like in other countries, when a husband has to give permission for his wife to do certain things or he has to buy items on account of the zār spirits, he proclaims disbelief. Zar meetings have also sometimes been suspected as meeting sites for orgies. Between the 1930s and 1950s, zar shifted from a more prestigious status to a lower-class one, and Ethiopians became more conscious of trying to obfuscate it from outsiders.

=== Somalia ===
Among Somalis, saar has been in decline, but has also transformed into being expressed at sitaat rituals and wedding parties, or at least those spaces absorbing and serving a similar purpose for women who once would have done saar. It was banned under the British Protectorate in 1955, and mingis specifically was banned by the Union of Islamic Courts, which took power in 2006. Public opinion of those not in the group is negative as men and women mix, non-halal substances may be consumed (alcohol and blood), and that the spirits should be avoided but are instead called forth. Sitaat and saar are often confused for each other by outsiders, and the former is considered improper Islamic practice while the latter is considered non-Islamic. Sitaat leaders stress that they have nothing to do with saar, and any jinn that came to their ceremonies would be harmed by the sacred air. The basic intentions of each ceremony is different: sitaat is about praising God and holy women, but saar is about placating spirits.

=== Sudan ===
In Sudan, zār bori (which is associated with Arab and Arabized Northerners) is often seen by male outsiders as women faking health issues so they can get away from their male relatives to drink, smoke, and gossip at zār gatherings- a resistance and dismissal regarded as ignorant by women. However, its power is not denied entirely, and men's own Islamic practice is not wholly incompatible with the predominant female zār practice. Even upper-class women who do not believe in the rite attend its ceremonies as occasional recreation, and in Khartoum it is slowly becoming a club promoting "theatrical activities, music, and folk art" as well as a ritual practice. Zār bori is seen as neither particularly Islamic or un-Islamic. In the final years of the 19th century, zār bori had enough followers that it was viewed as a threat to Orthodox Islam. In the 1980s, zār bori programs occasionally appeared on TV.

Bori practitioners view their rites as beneficial and Islamic, and attend them sometimes just to enjoy themselves, but generally view tumbura rites as demanding, difficult, esoteric, nasty and/or unpleasant. Bori leaders may claim the tumbura causes illness, or call its practitioners drunk, godless, thieves, slaves, and murderers. They view the zār Nyamānyam as not really being a type of zār, and as either non-Islamic or less Islamic.

However, zar tumbura, associated with non-Arabs of slave descent, is viewed as a bad fringe practice associated with magic and evil spirits. Its often confused with the Nuba ceremonial dance kampala. Practitioners acknowledge their relationship to slavery, but not in the same negative light. They state that they never drink, smoke, or dance lewdly during rituals as they claim bori practitioners do. Thought it is a mixed sex space in a way bori isn't, practitioners keep some distance from the opposite sex and are respectful.

Practitioners view Sudanese Arabs overall as religiously ignorant and afraid of tumbura because it is "strong and heavy" with bori not being as "strong" as tumbura, and its practitioners as wanting to make easy money with bogus ceremonies. By contrast, tumbura practitioners, in their own view, do not make money, but have kept their power, faithfulness to tradition, and knowledge. They view the zār Nyamānyam as a separate practice (but not negatively). though characters from the practice also appear in tumbura songs. All outsiders are viewed with caution, due to the sentiment that they do not treat tumbura people well.

Zar was banned under the Bashir regime, which was accompanied by public harassment and abuse of women for previously acceptable dress and behavior, and the banning of alcohol. Some leaders of bori and tumbura in the 1990s continued to practice zār, but at one point many were arrested and imprisoned, and sometimes beaten. By the 1990s, the practice of blood drinking for many zār practitioners was no longer done, but it was still being used to attack zār. By 2000, the Bashir regime chose to tolerate zār to appear more moderate.

=== Yemen ===
Zār bori was first banned in Aden in the 1920s. It was the first practice targeted by local reformers, who claimed it was a practice done by scammers and its music was a public nuisance. Adherents submitted counter-proposals to the ban by citing how long the zār had been practiced locally, its local acceptance, and by stating tumbura was worse as it was not gender-segregated. At first, zār adherents did not deny its religious nature, though they did so later on. They also argued ceremonies were not exorbitantly expensive, and that they allowed widows a way to earn income. The last ditch effort was to turn to the courts in 1932, which ultimately failed. Around this time, tumbura was also banned from saint's festivals, but allowed its weekly celebrations. Tumbura adherents defended themselves by immediately denying their religious nature, though over the years they unsuccessfully petitioned for access to saints' tombs again. Both practices were seen as religiously impure. Both practices continued under restriction into the 1960s.

== Other African possession rites ==
Alongside the Hamadsha, Hausa animism, and Voodou, other possession rites exist across Africa. These include: the Ethiopian shatana; the Chadian liban sheitan; the Kenyan Digo shaitani; the Kenyan Wataita saka or pepo; the Tanzanian Segeju shetani; the Tanzanian Ndembu's takuka; the Zambian Tonga masabe; the Mayotte trumba and patros; and the Songhay holey or hauka.

Many of these names likely ultimately derive from the Arabic word for devil, and many refer to the possessing spirits as "winds" (pepo in Swahili, iska in Hausa, and of course, reeh in Arabic), who are representations of human foreigners that cause illness. These practices are influenced by trade, cross participation in ceremonies held during the Hajj, and the migration of people. While they bear some similarities, they also maintain distinctions.

Other adorcist possession rites distinct from zār also exist in the regions zār is practiced in. Alongside zār, some Upper Egyptians have believed and practiced possession by the dead, during which the possessed would diagnose and cure people, foretell the future, mediate conflict, counsel the grieving, and more. While Winkler described these mediums as impotent, the medium he directly interacted with had many children, as did his son who had served as a medium. Winkler also recounts of a man who had a relationship to a she-demon, leading to him having the title of shaykha. Those with questions would pay the man two piasters, and inform him of their name, their mother's name, and their religious affiliations. He would whisper and stare at the floor- talking to the demon- before giving them an answer.

== See also ==
- Hamadsha
- Hausa Animism
- Adorcism
- Buda (folk religion)
- Stambali
- Gnawa
- Fann at-Tanbura
- Mazaher
- Superstition in Ethiopia
- Sufism
