= Stambali =

Tunisian music genre and rite

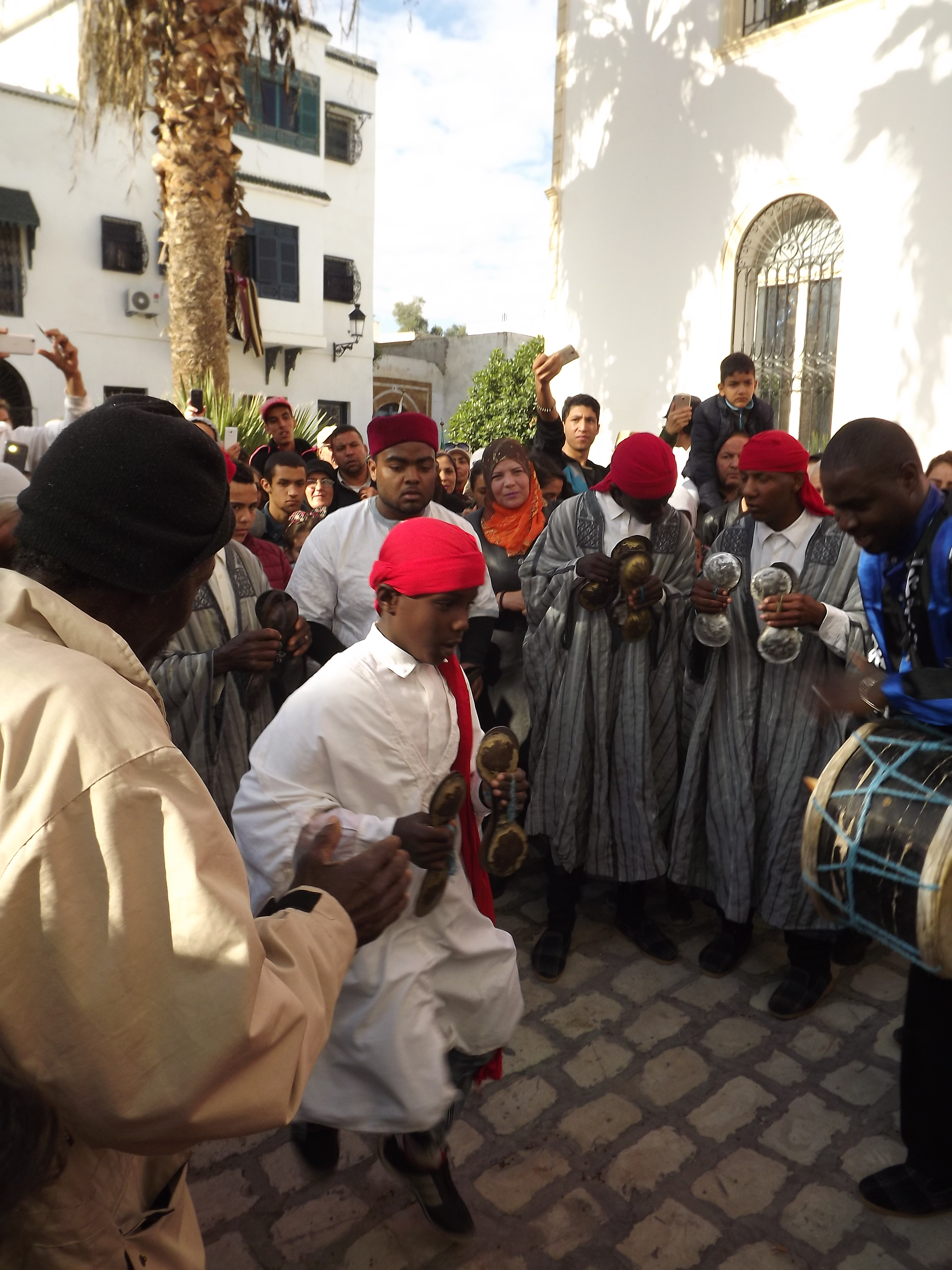
Public demonstration during a kharja for Mouled 2016.

Stambali or stambeli is both a music genre and a music based therapeutic possession rite practiced in parts of Tunisia, primarily by Black people of slave descent.

It combines music, dances and songs. During the music, some participants enter into a trance and embody supernatural entities, as a form of adorcism. The term more generally refers to the series of practices, of which the stambali constitutes the last stage, with a curative purpose or to ward off the evil eye. It brings together elements of West African and Maghrebi origin. Its beliefs and practices were not traditionally written down.

Possession by spirits isn't just about becoming the other. It also navigates relationships with others. The usage and maintenance of spirit traditions by displaced Black Africans shaped the cultural encounter between them and non-Black Tunisians in terms other than slavery or servitude. The ritual and music of stambeli is a product of two different cultures in the Sahelo-Saharan region coming into close contact, ans a commentary on how these cultures were brought in contact and proceeded to remain in contact. Stambeli does not seek to set Black and Non-Black regions of Africa apart. It brings connections between the two within the neglected Sahelo-Saharan context.

Sadok Rezgui describes this rite as a "kind of celebration in which Black Tunisians participate, where dance and instrumental sounds mingle at a frenetic pace". Some hypotheses link it to Haitian voodoo or Brazilian candomblé. However, it seems to be more directly related to Hausa practices, which are distinct from the influences of traditional Yoruba Religion and Voodun that originated Voodoo and Candomblé. Like most adorcist practices, stambeli believes that 1) the body is permeable to outside forces, 2) spirits and humans live alongside each other in the natural world and the actions of one can affect the other, and 3) music and dance are the methods through which positive human-spirit relations are formed and maintained.

A similar phenomenon is known in Morocco (gnawa), Algeria (diwan, derdeba, and "the Seven Springs"), Libya (makeli and sambani), Egypt and elsewhere in the Middle East (zār), and in West Africa (bori). Stambali is most similar to othet Maghrebi practices that thoroughly fuse the veneration of Muslim saints with that of African spirits, though to a lesser extent zar also incorporates saint veneration.

Modern musicians also take inspiration from stambeli and perform these derivations of the tradition for entertainment, without the context of spirit rituals.

== Origins ==
Although the meaning and origin of the word stambali are unclear, it is established that this rite originated among Black populations originating from further south in Africa, many of whom were trafficked to Tunisia as slaves. Some stambeli pracitioners hold that stambeli comes from "sambeli", a word they say refers to spirit possession practices in the Bilad as-Sudan. We do indeed find the word "sambeli" referring to illness caused by sorcery among the Songhay, and "sambale" among the Hausa as a "dance of youths and maidens". However, Tunisians outside of stambeli networks assume it comes from the word "istanbuli", because some Ottoman officials and rulers under the banner of Ottoman authority patronized stambeli groups. Stambeli can refer to the overall practice, the music, or just the trance ritual.

Possibly based on the Hausa Bori rite, as well as other Bilad as-Sudan spirit practices, it retains the practice of ritual possession, mediumship, and divination also found in those practices. In a syncretic approach to integration into Tunisian society, it assimilated Muslim beliefs and practices such as the popular cult of saints practiced throughout the Maghreb, which led to the creation of a pantheon composed of African spirits and Muslim saints. The first written evidence of spirit possession rituals practiced by Black Tunisians is from the 1700s. There may have also been Amazigh practices from before that point.

There are at least two typed of stambeli. One is associated with the communal houses, such as Dar Barnu, and the other is more strongly associated with zawiyas (saint shrines) like Sidi 'Ali el-Asmar. The two specific groups named as representatives here are the two biggest and most active stambeli groups in Tunis. The two kind of stambeli define themselves as opposites. A major difference between the two is that in zawiya-stambeli, only the 'arifa is possessed by spirits on behalf of the clients. The clients themselves are passive observers.

The followers of the Stambali, sometimes called "bilalians", also consider Sidi Bilal, a Black slave freed by Abu Bakr and the first muezzin of Islam, as the founder of their brotherhood, a myth intended to legitimize their presence within a society dominated by Islam. A similar belief is found in some varieties of zār, such as zār tumbura (which is mainly practiced by Black non-Arabs from Sudan).

Others recount that Bū Sa'idiyya was the first stambeli musician. Bū Sa'idiyya was a hunter from a region further south in Africa (probably again, meant to evoke Bilad as-Sudan). One day, he came back from hunting to find his only daughter, Sa'idiyya, gone. He found out she had been kidnapped by a slave caravan and traveled along their route to find her. He reached Tunisia, but it had taken a long time and his clothes were ragged, and he played metal clappers on the street while singing and begging for help in finding her. Unfortunately, he never succeeded. However, his appearance and music that marked him as an outsider in Tunisia made him recognizable to Black Tunisians, and he is said to have helped them find communal houses where people from their own cultures and regions lived.

== Terminology ==
Stambeli can refer to the overall tradition, music, or a specific ceremony. The songs are also called "nuba" (meaning "one's turn").

The spirits are called salhin, khul (Black), or in-nas il-ukhrin (the other people). Salhin (singular: salih) is typically translated as "holy spirits", and the term puts the African spirits on equal level to the heterogeneous Muslim saints. Thus the spirits are identified as Black, holy, and other.

There are multiple words for possession and possessed people in Tunisia. Meskun refers to a person one who has a spirit living peacefully within them. A memluk is a person who is possessed by a spirit. A medrub is a person who has been hit by a spirit. Mejnun is used to refer to people suffering from aggression caused by spirits, and may simply be used to mean "crazy".

== Spirits and Saints ==
African spirits across the continent are commonly grouped into families or societies corresponding to neighboring ethnolinguistic groups, immigrant groups, local ancestors, colonial officers, religious leaders, and so on. For stambeli, while it is seen as other, it has an inclusive ethos. It is equally comfortable interacting with Muslim and sudani spirits.

Both the "White" and "Black" spirits hurt and heal humans, have their own nubas, induce trance, and require sacrifices.

People are more vulnerable to possession by spirits at certain times. For example, if there is a death in the family, a person is more likely to become possessed. They also possess people who are careless with water. Additionally, specific types of behaviors are associated with different families of spirits. They react negatively to anger, and may possess people who have had a sudden fright. If a child is frightened or yelled at in a bathroom, they are especially likely to become possessed. They also dislike mockery, and will possess those who disrespect them.

Symptoms of spirit possession include paralysis, convulsions, syncope, tremors, blindness, deafness, muteness, and uncharacteristic behavior. Spirits may be associated with different ailments. In Dar Barnu these are evidence that the patient is "shattered" or "broken". This person may be said to be "inhabited" or "struck" by spirits. They may also say the spirits are "dressed" (yilbusu-ha) in the patient, wearing them like clothing. These terms are used interchangeably, but have different connotations. Struck implies a single encounter, dressed is a more embodied relationship but temporary, and inhabited is permanent and continuous.

Each spirit has its own nuba, which will usually be referred to just with the spirit's name. Spirits also have particular dance movements, animal sacrifices, incenses, colors, and costumes.

Different stambeli groups have different spirit pantheons and place different importance on saints and spirits. These different stambeli groups often map onto the communal house system, which is primarily based on geographic and cultural origin. Some stambeli groups divide the spirits into three groups: the saints, the "people of the sea" or blue spirits, and then the Black spirits. The "people of the sea" include the spirits Yarima and Sarkin N'Gari.

=== Spirits ===
The spirits are human-like and have families, personalities, genders, preferences, and wills. They may do things that surprise their hosts. They are not ancestors, anthropomorphizations, clan totems, or jinn (stambeli practitioners view the jinn negatively and think working with them would be both working with the devil and polytheism). They may be sorted into different groups based on different emphasis on their membership, even by members of the same stambeli tradition. These categorical differences may also be connected to differences in how stambeli traditions recognize a spirit's behavior as a legitimate or illegitimate possession.

Though the spirits are not demons, they are commonly mistaken for being demons by outsiders, including modern researchers trying to understand stambeli.

The spirits are "Black", never were human, have no legends or zawiyas, and enter and possess hosts. Many of them come from bori, but have changed. Some spirits also were not carried iver from bori, and some spirits are completely new. All of these spirits have distinctive dance movements, specific attire, and props like walking sticks, spears, knives, and rods that they may use to hit their hosts.

There are 5 total categories of spirits in the Dar Barnu tradition, but they are often collapsed into just three groups. These are the Banu Kuri, the Brawna, the Bahriyya, the Beyat, and the Sghar.

The Banu Kuri (children or tribe of Kuri) are Christians whose Blackness is emphasized. They are summoned first of all the spirit groups. Because the Dar Barnu and Banu Kuri are both from Bornu, the Dar Barnu must invoke them at all their ceremonies. The Banu Kuri must be invoked after sunset (ideally after midnight). Something black or dark colored needs to be eaten (often molokhiya). The Dar Barnu consider these spirits the most powerful and traditionally dedicate a room to their ritual paraphernalia. These spirits can sometimes be violent and beat their own hosts. The Brawna (spirits from Bornu) are usually subsumed into this group.

The first spirit to have their nuba played is Mashi. After him is Sarkin Kufa. Sarkin Kufa is known to be intolerant and rarely possesses people, though at most ceremonies his nuba still must be played.

After Sarkin Kufa are the blacksmiths Dandurusu (hammer) and Haddad (blacksmith). Then Garuji, a bori fighting spirit comes.

The next few spirits are the most popular among Dar Barnu's Banu Kuri. They are sometimes thebonly Banu Kuri spirits summoned. Dakaki (the crawler) is first of these; he dances by squirming in a prone position towards the gumbri. After he reaches it, it is Kuri's turn.

Kuri (hyena) is a Black spirit from Bornu, and important to the Dar Banu group. He is associated with the color black and a black kashabiyya (hooded cloak) is used for his costume. He likes wine, and hosts used to drink it while possessed. As of late, hosts instead pour out a bottle of red wine at an X shaped crossroads as an offering. The X represents an intersection of the social and spirit worlds. He dances on his knees, making climbing motions before falling. He will request a wooden pestle to beat the stomach of his host.

Next is his brother Migzu, who dances the same way but uses a walking stick instead of a pestle. After him is Kuri's brother Jamarkay (Jam Marakai "white maraki tree") and Baba Magojay.

Ya Arnawet (Ya, those of Arni) is a nuba in the Banu Kuri chain, but rarely performed. The Arnawet are a subgroup of spirits including Kuri, Migzu, Jamarkay, Baba Magojay, Nikiri, Salama, and Sayyed. These spirits in practice are not singled out from the rest of the Banu Kuri.

The Banu Kuri chain usually ends with Ummi Yenna (Mai-Inna) and her sisters. Ummi Yenna is Kuri's wife. Her host sits on the ground, covered in white cloth. Four women each take a corner of it and beat it up and down in time with the music. When the music stops, the host emerges as Ummi Yenna, telling people of their futures. Once done, this process repeats with her sisters Mama Zahra and Adama.

The Banu Kuri also includes Nikiri (Kuri's brother, who beats his hosts with a club with a hooked end), Salama, and Sayyed. Sayyed is the youngest spirit and sometimes is placed at the end of the Sghar spirits instead.

The Bahriyya are water spirits, and potentially malevolent. They had to be adapted very little to fit into a Tusinian context, as both majority Black and Non-Black Sahelo-Saharan countries have similar understandings of water spirits. In the latter, fishermen and sea farers often sacrifice to water spirits and saints associated with water, like Sidi Mansur and Sidi Dawd. Being careless with water is a common way people end up with spirit affliction, by angering spirits who were injured or disrupted by it. The Bahriyya live near streams, lakes, rivers, and oceans as well as wells, drains, bathtubs, toilets, and so on. They often afflict people who work with or near water, like fishermen, bath attendants, and maids. They need to be coaxed out during rituals by an 'arifa sprinkling water on the head and neck of the host.

The first spirit is either Jawayay or Ummi Yenna, and after them if his nuba is played will be Badam Khiyaru.

After this is the leader of the Bahriyya, Mulay Brahim, also known as Sarkin Ka'ba/Ka'bi, or Dodo Ibrahim. Dodo is a Hausa word for evil spirit that can also refer to "anything feared", such as chiefs or Europeans. He and many other Bahriyya spirits dance in a swimming motion.

After him are Bahriyya, Bakaba, and Sarkin Gari. Other spirits in the Bahriyya chain include May Saderwa (Mulay Brahim's mother), Sidi 'Ali Diwan (a hunter), Baba Musa/Musa Bahriyya, Lilla Malika, Derna, and Badaydu.

The Beyat (royals) have historical resonance with the beneficent Husaynids, who were succeeded by a government that was anti-Stambeli. The Sghar (children) tend to be subsumed into this role.

=== Saints ===
The saints are "White" (though not necessarily racially, as Bilal is a Black person, but a White spirit). They are historical figures with legends and zawiyas. During ceremonies they "take away" people, causing non-possession trance (jedba). Their dance movements are few in number, repetitive, and similar to non-Stambeli dances at other Maghrebi Muslim saint shrines. Most of the saints are local and not international figures, either living/dying in Tunisia or a neighboring country. Only a few of these saints are Black, but these saints are considered especially powerful.

The most important figures in this category are Mohammed and Bilal. Because they are closer to God, they are farther away from people, and as such never possess anyone, though the nubas of Mohammed (Slat in-Nabi) and Bilal (Jerma) are always played at the beginning of a ceremony, and are "tied together" (played in succession without stopping). Among stambeli pracitioners, Jerma is another name of Bilal. Jerma is an ethnolinguistic group near Bornu, and this nuba contains some Jerma words (like ka, meaning "come"). Bilal was one of the first Muslim converts, had a very close relationship to Mohammed, and the first prayer caller. He is important to many Black Muslim spiritual groups and symbolizes their role as musicians and intermediaries in the non-Black communities of Sahelo-Saharan Africa.

Bu Hijba comes after Jerma/Bilal, but is obscure and has no hosts. The saint seems to have fallen out of favor, but cant be skipped due to tradition. After these three, the saints have a loose hierarchy. Sidi Frej, Sidi Sa'd, 'Abd as-Salem, and el Jilani usually go next. The latter two are important for founding Sufi orders. The four together may be called "the shaykhs". Salem dances wearing a white cloak, uses fire during his dance, and may lead the gathered crowd in reciting fatiha.

Sidi Frej's dance is repetitive like other saints. His shrine is a pilgrimage site for stambeli practitioners.

Sidi Sa'd is a saint who was born in Bornu. He is particularly important to many Jewish participants in stambeli, a kind of "patron saint". He is overall more popular than Sidi Frej. He sometimes beats his host with wood clubs or shqāshiq, hitting both legs and then the head.

Sidi 'Abd al-Qadir is sometimes called the master of spirits (sultan is-salhin). He is associated with the color green and his costume includes a green kashabiyya and a green wooden staff.

Sidi Belhassen is another saint, with one of the most popular shrines in Tunis. His shrine has weekly Sufi ceremonies and occasional stambeli ceremonies. During droughts the stambeli groups would perform rituals, involving all of them getting in a procession with their flags and music to match to Sidi Belhassen's shrine. They would hold possession ceremonies next to the shrine, and on the hill with the shrine, Dar Ziriyya (a particular stambeli group) performed takai. He is not officially recognized as a stambeli saint, and aren't obligatory to celebrate during ceremonies, but he has a nuba to be played upon request. This is also the case for Sidi Ben 'Isa and Sadya Manubiyya.

Sidi Mansur of Sfax is associated with water and helps those with water related afflictions. Sometimes instead of appearing in the Saint's chain of nuba, he appears before or after the Bahriyya spirits. Black sailors used to gather in Sfax for stambeli.

Other saints include Sidi Marzug from Nefta, Sidi Bu Ra's el-'Ajmi, Sidi Amr, Sidi 'Amir Bu Khatwa, Sidi Amawi, Sidi Beshir, Sidi Hammuda, and Lilla Malika.

== Ceremony ==
In the first part of stambali, future adepts are identified during public rituals called tesmih. Their initiation takes place during the second cycle, through private rituals of a therapeutic nature: the arifa (seer and priestess) is usually then consulted to reveal the supernatural origin of the illness affecting the patient. The 'arifa is not always a woman, and can be possessed by any spirit in the pantheon. In Israel, Tunisian Jews have maintained the role of 'arifa, even in absence of the Black Tunisian community.

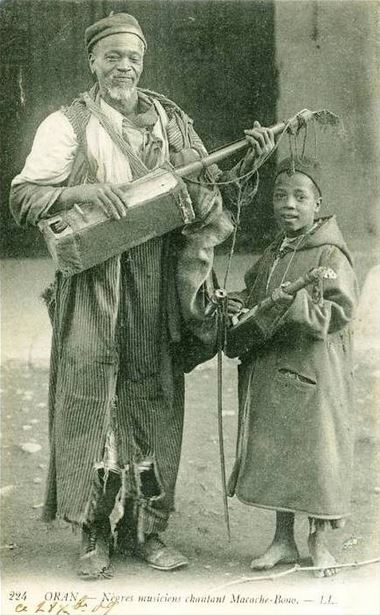
Guembri or gambara being played by Algerian Gnawa

The last cycle, that of the stambali itself, allows the followers to celebrate their rites in the sanctuaries of their saints. The ceremony (lila) is led by healing musicians including one or more arifa, a mâalem (master of ceremonies) playing the guembri, at certain moments the tabl (drum), and several chkacheks (shqāshiq) or qraqeb players. Initiation to the status of mâalem, which is only done by succession, involves musical apprenticeship, mastery of the guembri and sacrificial rites. The arifa, whose rank is the highest among the initiates and the equivalent of that of the mâalem, is considered to be the one who has the power to communicate with the melaks (spirits).

Another path into stambeli is that a client will become ill with something doctors fail to cure. They go to stambeli of their own accord to see if stambeli can help (and do not got to tesmih). The first step is to identify the spirit responsible. The client will go to a consultation with an 'arifa, and if the 'arifa has reason to suspect a stambeli spirit is either responsible or can help, the client is given certain medications and certain rites to do at home. During the consultation, the patient may be read the Prophet's prayer or verses from the Quran. The client's response determines if a spirit is a "believer" or a "non-believer". In the latter case, the patient will be recommended to go elsewhere; for example a Jewish spirit may be recommended to attend a Sufi group chanfing dhikr, since it only repeats the names of God. "Non-believer", i.e. non-Muslim spirits can't stand Muslim verses/prayer or gumbri music, while stambeli spirits enjoy both. If stambeli spirits are suspected the consultation continues with a detailed discussion of symptoms, when they started, and context. The answers and physical state of patient contribute to diagnosis.

If, for example, a patient has leg paralysis, came into contact with a dead body, or there is a reason to suspect "black magic", healers will suspect a spirit from Banu Kuri is responsible. They give the patient jawi akhad ("Black Java", an incense Banu Kuri likes). They must burn it before going to be for several days, and carry it through every room in the house. They cannot say "bismillah" while lighting it or walking through the rooms. Doing so is a custom to ward off jinn, and may offend the stambeli spirits of they think the patient is calling them jinn. The client must also take a certain amount of money, dip it in water 7 times, and wrap it in black cloth. This is placed under their pillow, and the patient will try to remember their dreams to tell to the 'arifa. The patient may improve, indicating the offerings were accepted. If they do not, it means the spirits want more offerings.

The next step is a divination to determine for certain which spirit(s) are responsible. The patient goes to the 'arifa again. The 'arifa lights incense to attract spirits, and has the patient sit on the ground. A sacrificial animal is circled around the patient (usually a chicken, dove, or goat). The animal is slaughtered, and spirits are called on musically to descend to be identified. The yinna performs silsilas of nubas till one provokes a significant reaction (trembling, shaking, fainting, convulsions, or dance). The patient will be "better" for now, and the spirit(s) have been successfully identified. The client gives some advance money to the yinna for the ceremony arrangements.

After this are two collective rituals; the sacrifice and the celebration/affirmation At the ceremony the yinna entices the patient to dance through patient until placated, staving off further affliction until the ceremony is repeated next year.

A bad diagnosis can have deadly consequences. If a patient who does not have stambeli spirits finds a stambeli troupe willing to conduct a ceremony with them in the patient role anyway, the spirits will be upset. They did not choose this person as a host. Such people are said to die or suffer misfortune.

Sacrifice is essential to all stambeli rituals. Each spirit has a particular performed sacrifice- a rooster, hen, dove, sheep, goat, or combination of these animals. The number of animals and color is also specific to the spirit. It is slaughtered halal and butchered on the spot, then cooked into a ritual meal that is also part of every stambeli. The sacrifice is one of the most expensive parts of the stambeli. Sacrifice is communication and opens up communication. It is part of the Maghrebi dynamics of exchange between humans and the supernatural.

Some rituals are smaller in scale and done for a specific client, while others are done with hundreds of participants over the course of several days during the yearly pilgrimage for a saint at their tomb. In both cases the spirits are summoned in a specific order from "White" first and "Black" last. The songs (nubas) are performed in specific chains, which structure both the ceremonies and the pantheon of spirits.

The kinds of ceremonies include processions, private ceremonies for individual clients, yearly large gatherings during pilgrimages at saint shrines, divination, and more. The divination practice is carried over from the Sahelian cultural element of stambeli. Jewish Tunisians, in addition to possession ceremonies, would hold a stambeli ceremony when they feared the risk of the evil eye, such as after a bar mitzvah, wedding, or buying a new house.

The invocation of the melaks is carried out by songs – interpreted by the mâalem and taken up by the troupe – and nubas played in a precise order and corresponding to each of them: "white spirits" (saints of popular Islam including Sidi Abdelkader, Sidi Mansour, Sidi Ameur, Sidi Saad and Sidi Frej), "blue spirits" (Yarima and his brother Sarki N'Gari) and "black spirits" (Sidi Marzoug and Baba Kouri). The followers can only be possessed by a melak, supposed to be at the origin of their illness, their entry into a trance allows the mâalem to confirm which spirit has "descended" to cure them. The seven families of spirits being identified by a color, the follower covers himself with a cloth of the corresponding color when entering a trance. The Sidi Ali Lasmar mausoleum of Bab Jedid, in Tunis, is one of the last places where this rite is practiced, Dar Barnou constituting the seat of one of the last Stambali brotherhoods in the country.

Mustapha Chelbi described a ceremony as follows: "The Stambali takes place in a tense atmosphere, so much so that the fat woman who just now had difficulty moving, walking, feels curiously light when she is overcome by the need to dance. She covers her face with a large scarf and rocks back and forth until she loses consciousness. Another replaces her and it is contagious, the orchestra plays even louder and only stops when an grandmother appears and dances until she faints to the loud cries of the family... A key is put in her hand... She comes to, she is kissed, because she has experienced something essential and everything becomes calm again."

During the ceremony, possessed people may beat themselves with various implements, pass torches of burning grass under their arms, hold hot coals, tear at their clothes, throw themselves to the ground or at other people, and so on. The musicians keep watch to ensure they do not harm themselves or others while in trance. They do not feel pain in trance. Many do not remember what happened afterwards and describe their souls as leaving their bodies or say they are "emptied".

The area where rituals take place is called a midan, and this word is also used in many zar groups for the same thing.

Incense is used heavily at stambeli rituals. Women often wear bright colors (the spirits like these), and red, white, and green are common. Silky fabrics and sequins also often appear on the clothes worn by attendees. Jewish stambeli participants may have a lead dancer, who must wear red and dance with a metal tray full of incense on her head. The atmosphere of rituals is happy, and attendees adorn themselves with henna the way they would for a wedding. Large amounts of food (candy, salads, spicy oils) are prepared. In Israel the ceremonies are gender segregated; when the women dance the men must leave the room. Only the male musicians can stay. This is because entranced women may loosen their hair, tear at their clothes, have clothing ride up or come undone, or even undress, and this is considered something men should not witness.

Animal sacrifice is an important part of stambeli. It has been retained among Jewish Tunisians in Israel. There, the sacrifice (due to financial issues) is usually a cockrel. Alongside the animal sacrifice, spirits may ask for certain clothes or jewelry that the possessed will wear.

Music is used to structure the rituals in sense of time and space, while also healing. The structure of songs also sets the spirits in a hierarchy. The name of the nuba is often just the name of the spirit, and is how their potential presence is recognized. The nubas and spirits sit in networks with others, and are sorted into silsila (chains) dictating appropriate orders. Certain nubas can or can't be played after others. Usually, the oldest and most powerful spirits go first, and then the younger ones. However, there is room to improvise. Nubas can be repeated or skipped, and some non-normative ordering can occur. At private ceremonies, the host's nubas will be played the most. Certain nubas also must be played if one spirit's host is present, even if no hosts are present for the other spirit.

Jewish stambeli was notable in that it used to use (when there was a significant Jewish community in Tunisia) 3 musical ensembles, who performed in different rooms. The stambeli group used a small gumbri (gumbri dha'if), shqāshiq, and kurkutuwat (small kettledrums played with sticks). The Jewish rbabiyya group used the rebab fiddle, tar (tambourine), and darbukka (clay goblet drum). Finally, the awled iz-zawiya (sons of zawiya) performed praise songs on the mizwid (bagpipes) or zukra (double reed aerophone), along with the bendir (frame drum with snares), and darbukka. Today Jewish Tunisians in Israel have bands that play tomtom drums, tambourines, bagpipes, flutes, and cymbals. The gumbri is conspicuously absent. They no longer play in separate rooms. The lyrics are improvised, and supposedly the dance movements are too.

The gumbri facilitates communication between the pantheon and humans. Because of this and how important it is, it can only be played by the yinna (also spelled yenna), who is the master musician and main ritual authority. He may also be called m'allim (master). He leads the troupe and mentors other musicians (sunna or shqāshiqiyya), who usually play the shqāshiq and serve as a response chorus. In the Dar Barnu tradition, the yinna sometimes diagnoses the afflicted, selects remedies, and determines the correct ritual procedures. The yinna structures the ceremony by selecting and ordering the nubas, marking their start and end, and responding to the behavior of dancers and spirits. Today there are only 5 known yinnas in Tunis. Stambeli has retained a stronger community and transmission further south in the country, near Nefta, but participants there still feel their practices are endangered.

During performances, the yinna is flanked by the sunna on his left and right. Within the sunna is an informal hierarchy; the musician on the yinna's right is usually the most accomplished, and he serves as lead singer (though sometimes the yinna will lead in singing). The rest of the sunna is the response chorus.

The sunna also are responsible for preparing the ritual by lighting incense, retrieving props and clothes for dancers, and sometimes slaughtering animals. They are trained by the yinna, and at Dar Barnu are expected to call him baba (father). Other stambeli musicians who are not a part of a yinna's usual troupe instead call him khali (maternal uncle). The sunna are treated like family at Dar Barnu. They start acquiring stambeli knowledge by first attending rituals, with limited support roles. They imitate the shqāshiq playing and participate in the response chorus, gradually picking up and developing musical knowledge. They start to be asked to fill in for regular sunna players, and based on talent and reliability, may make the short list that the yinna chooses his sunna for ceremonies from.

One of the older members of Dar Barnu in the 90s, Baba Majid, recalled that when he was young many stambeli musicians were possessive of their knowledge and reluctant to pass it on. He had to learn discreetly by paying close attention to the gumbri at rituals, and made himself a small gumbri to practice with. By contrast he was more open, but found himself frustrated by many of his apprentices not taking the time to do things properly. The yinna's skill is a product of their predecessors. They observe the older yinnas, observing their style and taking elements that appealed to create their own.

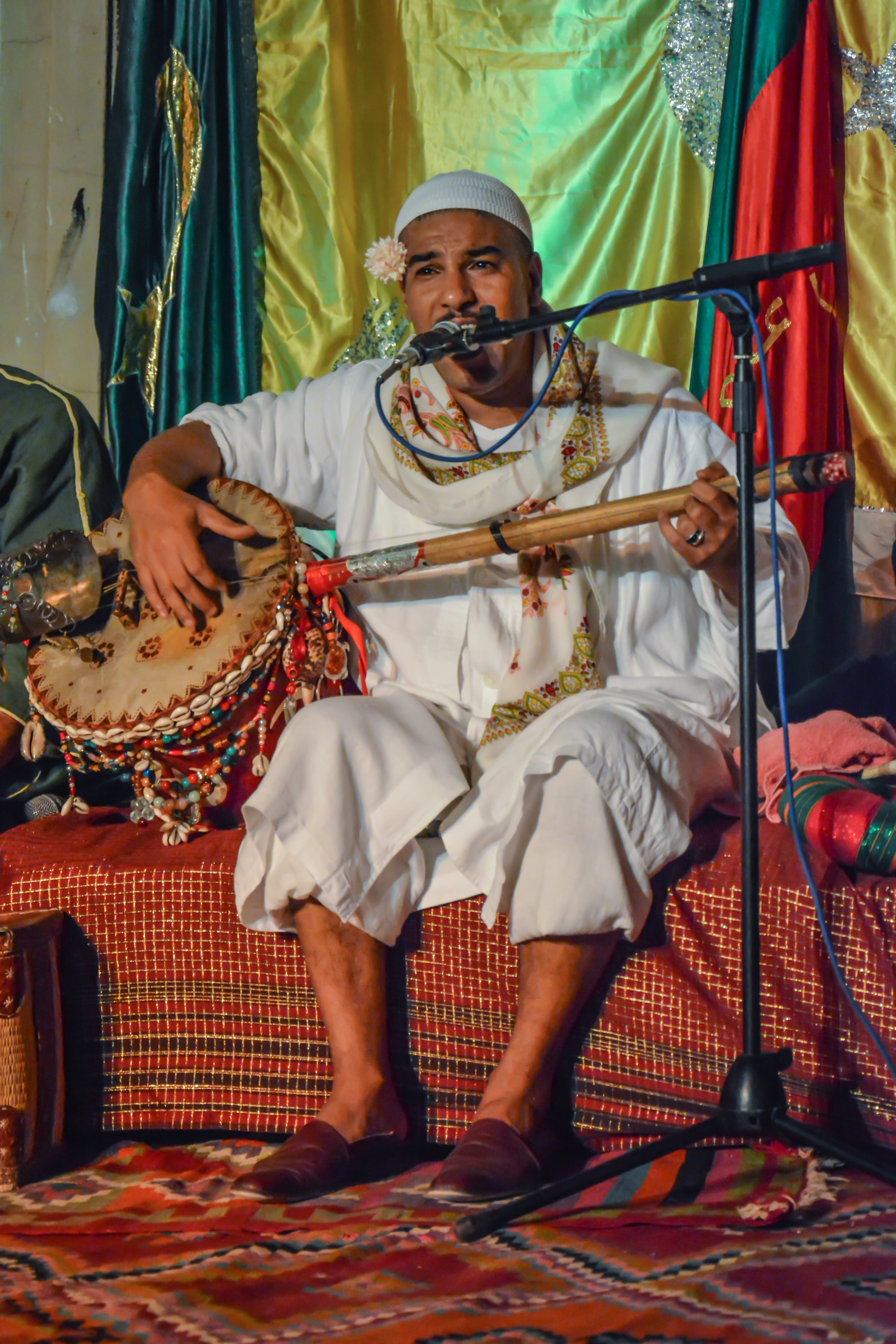
Tunisian gumbri, with its distinctive round body. Other Maghrebi lutes derived from Sahelian instruments often have a rectangular body.

The gumbri is a three stringed plucked lute in the bass register. The body is usually made from multiple pieces of wood, and covered on the front with a piece of goatskin. They used to be carved from a single piece, but this is now rare. Round wooden boxes (former cookie containers) and tomtom drums are sometimes used to make the body, but the latter is not used for gumbris played in rituals. The body has a square hole cut into it on the side, facing upwards to the performer. This is used to access things played inside the gumbri, lika amulets, money, and spare instrument parts. The neck is a pole that is inserted fully through the body, and the string are attached to it with leather strips that can be loosened, moved, and retied for tuning. A small wooden bridge with grooves carved into it holds the strings above the goatskin on the body, and bevind it is a small metal resonating plate pierced by metal rings that may hold amulets. Between performances, the bridge and resonator are stored inside the gumbri. The strings, goatskin, and resonator work together to create the "buzz" of the gumbri. The left hand controls the strings from the neck, while the right strums and pucks strings, or strikes the goatskin. The body diameter is usually around 15 inches in diameter and 12 inches deep. The total length of the instrument averages 44 inches. The smaller gumbri dha'if used to be used at ceremonies and processions, but is now mostly a practice instrument.

The gumbris are personalized and highly decorated. It is painted and adorned with cowrie shells. The goatskin, which is replaced once a year, has patterns on it made using henna, paint, and harqus (a black dye used to draw temporary tattoo-like patterns on the skin). They often have charms and amulets, such as fish and hamsas. Gumbris were the main ritual instrument of Dar Kufa. In some of the earliest descriptions of stambeli, the gumbri is described as a sacred instrument that offerings were made to. It "speaks" to the spirits and "draws them in". The spirits do not appear in abscene of the gumbri, and the gumbri can communicate with spirits entirely by itself, but when used for possession rituals the spirits prefer the shqāshiq to also be played so they can dance.

The shqāshiq (also called chkacheks) are clappers made from four identical metal plates (two for each hand). Iron is the preferred metal. Each plate is shaped like a figure 8 with two convex domes on the outer side. Leather straps attach them to the hand. One plate is fastened to the thumb and the other is fastened to the middle and ring finger. The minimum number of shqāshiq players for a ritual is two (two shqāshiq being played), but ideally there ahould be at least four players (eight shqāshiq being played). At pilgrimage ceremonies even more shqāshiq players are often present. Similar metal clappers called sambani were used in Hausaland for bori ceremonies, before being banned by the Sokoto Caliphate. They re-emerged as a woman's instrument to accompany Islamic music. They are also used (with the same name) in northern Ghana for blacksmith's dances.

The first clappers of this type might have been bone or wood (an early stambeli account describes clappers made of ostrich bone). When transmitted to the Maghreb, they were brought to the blacksmiths to make better copies from iron. These blacksmiths were often Black Africans. From there, the instrument was transmitted back to West Africa and the Sahel. Similar clappers exist in Morocco, but are manufactured and played differently. Tunisian clappers are heavier and the plates can be misaligned and pulled apart quite a lot to get different sounds.

The third instrument important to the Dar Barnu tradition is the tabla drum. It is a double headed barrel drum played on one side of the instrument with an open hand and a straight drumstick. It is used in place of the gumbri for ceremonies that start before sunset; the gumbri is usually played in the evening and at night. Like the gumbri, the tabla speaks to the spirits, and the rhythms for playing it are based on the gumbri. It is accompanied by shqāshiq and singing. It is also used in place of the gumbri during street processions, now that the gumbri dha'if is no longer used for that purpose. It commonmy has a fabric or leather strap to hold it up while being played. It is the only instrument of these three that resembles Tunisian instruments not used for stambeli. However, it is played in a distinctive style recognized as Sahelian.

A smaller barrel drum called a dundufa used to be used during processions as well. Other percussion instruments and styles of playing are used in an ensemble for pilgrimage, called debdabu: here, the yinna plays a tabla, but rotated 90 degrees, so that each hand can strike the drum head. It is played with one round and one flat stick. The sunna accompanies him with one gas'a (a drum shaped like an upside-down bowl), two kurkutuwat (small kettledrums), and two bendir (frame drums with snares).

At Dar Bambara, a rectangular lute without a resonating plate was the main instrument. It was called the gambara (the gumbri's little sister) and associated with Algeria. It is rarely played in Tunis.

The fakrun (turtle) is very similar to the gumbri, being a spike lute, but its body is made of a turtle shell. Soundholes are cut into the skin cover, and the neck touches the skin. It was likely brought to Tunis by enslaved people from further west than Bornu, from Senegal, Mali, and Mauritania.

The gugay is a 1-2 string spike lute played with a bow, sometimes described as a "fiddle". The body is made from half a gourd. It has the same round neck, leather tuning straps, and bridge as the other stringed instruments used in stambeli. It probably comes from the Hausa goge, which is used in bori rituals. The goge was banned under the Sokoto Caliphate for this reason.

Some Tunisian Jews in Israel use video or audio cassettes of stambeli performances to hold private ceremonies without the presence of a band.

The lyrics are considered du'a, invocations, that summon and welcome the spirits and saints. Stambeli songs are short and repetitive, compared to the longer and usually narrative Sufi songs. They repeat invitations to the spirits and saints to join the ceremony. Alongside praising the spirits and saints, the songs praise God and Muhammad.

Some of the songs are fully in Arabic, and some have Hausa, Kanuri, and Zarma words. Some are almost entirely in Hausa. The lyrics can be changed and are less important than the instrumentation; in a strange way, that helped these linguistic influences survive. The delivery of vocals is more important than the words. The aesthetic of the singing should be sudani. It should reflect the gumbri, being understated and flowing, and not clearly enunciated (in contrast the very enunciated Arabic style).

The music increases in tempo and speed as one travels through the pantheon. The saints have slower starting rhythms than the spirits.

The yinnas and 'arifas usually have the knowledge passed down through families, though sometimes spirits will choose an 'arifa (signified by illness).

== Demographics and perception ==
While Stambali is mainly known for being practiced by Tunisians (especially Black Tunisians) who are mainly Muslims, it is also practiced by Tunisian Jews, especially Jewish women. As such it has continued to be practiced by some Jewish Tunisians in Israel and other countries. These Jews are not themselves of slave descent, though when they lived in Tunisia, they frequently interacted with Black Tunisians of slave descent during Stambali rituals. Stambeli is stigmatized in Israel, and many practitioners are secretive about it due to fear of judgement and potential legal prosecution.

Stambeli pracitioners, whether they are Muslim or Jewish, do not perceive stambeli as a separate "religion", and do not see it as conflicting with their religious practices. Many of them are devout and go to their houses of worship regularly.

Stambeli likely developed in communal houses set up by Black Africans. Trafficked and diasporic Black Africans, as well as their descendants, would live in these houses together, enabling them to be around other people who spoke the same languages and had similar beliefs. This helped ease people into the new social environment they found themselves in Tunisia. These houses sometimes organized around primarily serving a specific community (such as people from Bornu), but did not exclude other Black people if they did not belong to that subgroup. Due to these common origins, these communal houses had slightly different ways of practicing stambeli, influenced by their different origins. They had different spirit pantheons and different ways of understanding possession. These distinctions continue today even as the communal houses have declined.

Stambeli is an object of both intrigue and scorn in Tunisia. Many Tunisians are fascinated by it or are participants, especially due to the global rise in recognition of gnawa music and ceremony. Others (sometimes even while participating in stambeli) view it as un-Islamic, or as primitive and preventing modern development. Due to the "modernizing" negative attitudes towards stambeli, public ceremonies and discussions of stambeli in books and on TV were suppressed for many years. This was also true of the "more Islamic" cult of the saints (maraboutism). Bourguiba forcibly closed, appropriated, or destroyed many zawiyas in Tunisia. He also attacked other practices and cultural expressions from other groups, in order to create a unified national identity of Tunisian-ness. Because of these attacks, stambeli survived in private homes, behind closed doors. This alienated many Tunisians from stambeli, which formerly was publicly visible.

A lot of the backlash comes from how stambeli facilitates interaction across social boundaries of race, sex, and religion. Alongside worries of "Black paganism" corrupting and misleading non-Black Tunisians, detractors have accused stambeli of various immoral acts related to women. Some of the most common are: letting women mingle with men, giving women high status at ceremonies, letting them be too independent, and Black women seducing non-Black women into lesbianism.

Today, stambeli still remains in a precarious situation, though it is not officially discriminated against. Stambeli is not seen as part of Tunisian cultural heritage by the government, but as something foreign. The government does not devote cultural heritage preservation resources to it. Young people are less likely to learn the music and take up position as ritual leaders because they don't stand to gain any monetary value or recognition for it. In the past, it was expected you would earn what people were willing to give, but the modern era has changed expectations of many aspiring musicians.

Many Black Tunisians still place value on stambeli, whether they are participants or not. Rania Romdhane, an activist for Tunisia's leading anti-racism organization, views stambeli as a form of resistance that preserves Black history. However, others feel that non-Black Tunisians have hijacked stambeli and appropriated from it, leaving some Black Tunisians feeling alienated.

Riadh Ezzawech is a stambeli practitioner devoted to keeping the practice alive. Though he is not Black and his family was dismayed to hear that he wanted to become a stambeli musician, the existing community accepted him. As of 2022, he set up an association for teaching stambeli in the zawiya of Sidi Ali Lasmar, which had been in operation since 2016. However, he has faced issues. The zawiya was sold to a private owner during the Bourguiba years. For years people paid rent to secure the zawiya's upkeep, but in 2022 the owners son was trying to sell it to a Tunisian developer and demanded about 40,000 euros from Ezzawech and others using the saint's shrine. When he tried to contact the Ministry of Culture for help preserving the shrine, Ezzawech was ignored. As of 2024, he has successfully retained the zawiya, and it was added to a list of protected historical monuments. Ezzawech still feels he is in a tenuous position, however.

Stambeli groups have organized performances and gatherings where they come together from across the country, and even invite music groups from other countries. These include their sister adorcist musicians from Morocco and Algeria. They have also organized a revival of the Mouldia, a procession involving many stambeli musicians that starts at the Sidi Mehrez mausoleum. The Mouldia was discontinued after 1942, but revived in 2016. In recent years this has included as many as 94 musicians and 30 other participants in the procession, with over a thousand spectators. Like with the new performances, musicians come from across the country to participate.

== Comparison to other spiritual practices ==
Hausa spirits from bori frequently appear in stambeli. The Hausa also influenced zar. However, the Hausa spirits like the Sarkins were not directly adopted into zar, though spirits with Hausa personalities appear in zar. Unlike zar and many bori groups, stambeli does not primarily deal with waves of incoming strangers. It instead memorializes the dispersion of Black people across Tunisia.

Unlike in Voodoo, the African spirits in stambeli are not identified as being the more normative Abrahamic saints. Instead the two groups are kept separate and defined as fundamentally different (saints were once living humans, while spirits have never been human). Further, the two spirit groups are not oppositional and do not experience role reversals the way Haitian and Yoruba spirits do.

Zar, bori, and many other African adorcist practices refer to spirits as "winds", alongside other terms like jinn, devils, spirits, and so on. However, this metaphor does not appear in stambeli. Zar spirits also tend to hang out around water sources (including natural and man-made ones) in addition to many other haunts, such as cemeteries. They have personalities, colors, preferred sacrifices, and are grouped into categories often corresponding to ethnic group, though the latter is somewhat less prominent in Egyptian zar, and more prominent in Sudan. Water spirits feature fairly prominently in zar. Spirits in stambeli do not speak publicly through the host about what they want (which is done in zar). They speak through the 'arifa, and are interpreted by another 'arifa or her assistant.

Stambeli, bori, and zar all feature a stringed instrument prominently. Zar features a lyre called the tumbura, rababa, or tanbura extensively, and the lyre even gives one variety of zar its name. Stambeli and bori in turn both feature lutes. Drums also have a place of secondary importance in many zar groups.

Zar groups often have a small piece of jewelry they wear to signify their belonging to zar, sometimes with the image of their spirit on it. This does not seem to be the case in stambeli.

Animal sacrifice is an important part of many adorcist rituals in Africa. The sacrifice in stambeli is not decorated before slaughter the way it sometimes is in zar. The participants do not consume fresh blood as the 'Aissawa and Hamadsha of Morocco are known to do, though this may have happened in the past. Bloos being wiped on a patient may have replaced consuming it, as Muslims are not supposed to consume blood.

== See also ==
- Zār
- Hamadsha
- Gnawa
- Marabout
- Adorcism
- Hausa Bori
