= Aisha Qandicha =

Moroccan female mythological figure

This image represents the Jinn Aisha Kandisha from Moroccan folklore

Aicha Kandicha (Moroccan Arabic: عائشة قنديشة, romanized: ʿĀʾisha Qandīsha, referred to in some works as Qandisa) is a female mythological figure in Moroccan folklore. One of a number of folkloric characters who are similar to jinn but have distinct personalities, she is typically depicted as a beautiful young woman who has the legs of a hoofed animal such as a goat or camel and who lives near rivers, lakes and the sea and who can manipulate water by moving it or turning it to ice. Although descriptions of Aicha Kandicha vary from region to region in Morocco, she is generally believed to wear a cloak with provocative white clothing underneath and to use her beauty to seduce local men and then drive them mad or kill them.

Aisha Qandicha is associated with the Hamadsha and Zār societies, who conduct rites to voluntarily seek spirit possession by her as well as other djinn.

== Origins ==
Edvard Westermarck claimed that Aicha Kandicha's name is "distinctly of Eastern origin," co-identifying her with Qetesh in ancient Canaanite religion, who he identified as "the temple harlot" and tying her to the cult of the goddess Astarte, incorrectly characterised as a "fertility" goddess. Westermarck suggests that Phoenician colonies in North Africa first introduced Kandicha, who was later folded into Islamic traditions while maintaining her licentious nature and association with aquatic environments. He also proposes that her associate Hammu Qayyu may be inspired by the Carthaginian god Hammon. Westermarck's theory relied on an antiquated understanding of ancient Near Eastern deities. Theories presenting Qetesh as a "sacred harlot" are regarded as obsolete in modern scholarship due to lack of evidence, and she's generally regarded as a goddess developed in Egypt possibly without a clear forerunner among Canaanite or Syrian goddesses, though given a Semitic name and associated mostly with foreign deities. A direct connection between Qetesh and Astarte - associated, depending on the time period and area, with war, hunting, royal power, healing etc., but not with fertility as Westermarck claimed - cannot be established. Relatedly, one theory is that the name "Qandicha" (قنديشة) is related to "Qirtajia" (قرطاجية), which is Arabic for "Carthaginian" (feminine, adjective). According to the Encyclopaedia of Islam, "Qandisha" comes from the Hebrew qedēshā meaning "sacred prostitute".

A more recent proposal is that Kandicha was derived from a real historical figure, namely a Moroccan "countess" (contessa) from el Jadida who helped resist the Portuguese by seducing soldiers, who were then killed by Moroccan fighters lying in wait. It is believed that she began resisting Colonialism after her husband was killed. Aïcha would have so many men that the soldiers began to fear her. Locals believed she had supernatural powers.

== Features ==
Nearly all accounts of Aicha Kandicha identify her home as a nearby body of water. In Tangier, this is thought to be the sea, in Tétouan it is the Martil, in Fez it is a drainage canal, and among the Beni Ahsen it is the Sebou. There is also general agreement that she preys upon young men, whom she entices with her beauty or by posing as their wives. More localized beliefs about Aicha Kandicha, such as those of the Beni Ahsen, include that she is afraid of steel knives and needles and has a husband (or male associate) known as Hammu Qayyu. In more southern regions of Morocco, including Doukkala, she is instead called "Kharaja."

In the traditions of the Buffi Sufi order, Aicha Kandicha is only one of several female jinn with the given name Aicha, each of whom have different personalities. The Buffis believe her to wear black garments, have camel-like feet, cause pregnant women who see her to miscarry, and cause people she possesses to bray or bark like animals. Names that may be synonymous with Aicha Kandicha elsewhere—including "Spicy Aicha" (ʿayša s-sudaniya) and "Aicha of the Sea" (ʿayša l-bəḥriya) -- are seen by the Buffis as unique entities. However, Lalla Aisha has neither a tomb nor a grave, her soul roams the place according to the prevailing beliefs, and her blessing is able to fulfill the wishes of everyone who visits her.

== In popular culture ==
Aicha Kandicha has been referenced in a number of Moroccan cultural works, including books, films, and songs. One example is the Gnawa tune Lalla Aicha and the French horror movie Kandisha.

== See also ==
- Succubus
- Sihuanaba
- Patasola
- Hulder
- Siren
- Xana
- Moura Encantada
- Tunda
- Pontianak (folklore)
- Leanan sídhe
- Glaistig
- Baobhan sith
- Hamadsha
