= Drawing down the Moon (ritual) =

Wiccan ritual

Drawing down the Moon (also known as drawing down the Goddess) is a central ritual in many contemporary Wiccan traditions. During the ritual, a coven's High Priestess enters a trance and requests that the Goddess or Triple Goddess, symbolized by the Moon, enter her body and speak through her. The High Priestess may be aided by the High Priest, who invokes the spirit of the Goddess. During her trance, the Goddess is supposed to speak through the High Priestess.

== History ==
The name most likely comes from a depiction of two women and the moon on an ancient Greek vase, believed to date from the second century BCE.

It could also come from line 145 of Claudian’s First Book Against Rufinus. Megaera, one of the Erinyes, in the guise of an old man, speaks to Rufinus:

Despise not an old man’s feeble limbs: I have the gift of magic and the fire of prophecy is within me. I have learned the incantations wherewith Thessalian witches pull down the bright moon, I know the meaning of the wise Egyptians’ runes, the art whereby the Chaldeans impose their will upon the subject gods, the various saps that flow within trees and the power of deadly herbs; all those that grow on Caucasus rich in poisonous plants, or, to man’s bane, clothe the crags of Scythia; herbs such as cruel Medea gathered and curious Circe.

In classical times, the Greek astronomer Aglaonice of Thessaly and ancient Thessalian witches were believed to control the moon, according to the tract: "If I command the moon, it will come down; and if I wish to withhold the day, night will linger over my head; and again, if I wish to embark on the sea, I need no ship, and if I wish to fly through the air, I am free from my weight."

== In Wicca ==
The drawing down of the moon derives from the Vangelo. In this a poem defining the drawing down of the moon is written and this has been used as the basis for the drawing down of the moon by various Wiccan groups. The practice forms part of both Gardnerian and Cochranian rites. The practice is also referenced in Reginald Scot's "The Discoverie of Witchcraft".

Though a number of Wiccan traditions may practice a variation of the ritual, the modern form likely originated in Gardnerian Wicca, and is considered a central element of Gardnerian and Alexandrian Wiccan ceremonies. During the modern rite, the High Priestess may recite the Charge of the Goddess, a text based in a mixture of writings by Gerald Gardner and Aleister Crowley, though now often used in its recension by Doreen Valiente, High Priestess in the Gardnerian tradition.

Mel D. Faber explains the ritual in psychoanalytical terms of attempting to re-unite with the protective-mother archetype.

In modern traditions, some solitary Wiccans also perform the ritual, usually within a circle and performed under the light of a full Moon. The solitary will stand in the Goddess Pose (both arms held high, palms up, body and arms forming a 'Y') and recite a charge, or chant.

== The ritual in print ==
"Drawing Down the Moon" is also the title of a book by National Public Radio reporter, Margot Adler— Drawing Down the Moon: Witches, Druids, Goddess-Worshippers, and Other Pagans in America Today—originally published in 1979. Adler writes:

...in this ritual, one of the most serious and beautiful in the modern Craft, the priest invokes into the priestess (or, depending on your point of view, she evokes from within herself) the Goddess or Triple Goddess, symbolized by the phases of the moon. She is known by a thousand names, and among them were those I had used as a child. In some Craft rituals the priestess goes into a trance and speaks; in other traditions the ritual is a more formal dramatic dialogue, often of intense beauty, in which, again, the priestess speaks, taking the role of the Goddess. In both instances, the priestess functions as the Goddess incarnate, within the circle.

== See also ==
- Adorcism
