= Adorcism =

Term in the sociology of religion

In the sociology of religion, Luc de Heusch coined the term adorcism for practices to placate or accommodate spiritual entities in a possessed person or place. Unlike exorcism, the relationship with the entities is potentially positive. This is sometimes used as initiation into a spirit cult.

Jean-Michel Oughourlian defines adorcism as "voluntary, desired, and curative possessions".

== Occurrence ==
Adorcism is found in Afro-American Voodoo, the Zār rites of Northeast Africa and West Asia, the Hausa's Bori rites, Tunisian Stambali, in parts of Southeast Asia, Moroccan Hamadsha, Egyptian "ghost riders", among Hindus and localized Indian religious groups (including among transgender people), and other religious practices. It is generally common among African spiritual traditions, whether adherents are Christians, Muslims, or belong to a traditional religion.

Like the zār spirits, the ghosts in the "ghost rider" tradition sometimes cause illnesses to communicate with the living about their desires. However, their demands often relate to their tombs and the specifics of their mourning, as opposed to the jewelry and clothes of the zār.

Some scholars think the general tradition of adorcism and possession-healing practices with music may be thousands of years old, due to how widespread it is. Janzen argues Ngoma, a Bantu healing practice that prominently features the ngoma drum, may be 2,000 years old.

Adorcism also describes the oracular practices found in Greece, which may have come from Egypt's Per-Wadjet oracle. In Book II (Euterpe), Herodotus relates that the priestesses of Dodona said that two black doves came from Thebes in Egypt to them and Libya, and both told the people there to establish oracles. He analyzes this as a mythologization of Egyptian women coming to both places and bringing the rites of an oracle with them. The doves are black because many Egyptians had darker skin than Greeks, and they are doves because at first the women would not have been able to speak Greek, and Egyptian to the Greek ear may as well be the speech of an animal, but once they had learned Greek they would be speaking in a "human voice". He remarks that, in his view, the oracles of Dodona and Thebes resemble each other, and that the rites of Egyptian priests are older than that of the Greeks, and that he thinks they adopted them from Egypt. The priestesses at Dodona would enter trance, though this does not seem to be as prominent as the trances of the Pythia at Delphi, and was borrowed from them. The Delphic oracle possibly dates back to the 1400s BC in Mycenean Greece, and if there is a connection between Per-Wadjet's oracle and it, Minoa likely was an intermediary.

There is some evidence for adorcism and possession-trance (a commonly linked phenomenon) in Pre-Exilic Israelite religion. In Samuel and Numbers, it occurs as a way of the divine affirming someone should be selected for a leadership position, with the spirit of God seizing hold of a person. This divine confirmation only occurs once in Numbers. However, in Samuel a group experiences that same possession without clarity as to why. Saul is also both seized by the spirit of God to protect David from him, and has the spirit of God leave him and be replaced by a bad spirit from God which is soothed by David's music. In 2 Kings, the prophet Elisha experiences prophetic possession-trance brought on in conjunction with music. The first instance of Saul's possession with the larger group of tracers in the book of Samuel is also accompanied by music.

== See also ==
- Candomblé – Syncretic religion from Brazil
- Drawing down the Goddess – Wiccan ritual
- Exorcism – Evicting spiritual entities from a person or area
- Haitian Vodou – Religion from Haiti
- Hausa animism – Religion of Hausa people in West Africa
- Lên đồng – Vietnamese shamanic ritual
- Speaking in tongues – Phenomenon in which people speak words apparently in languages unknown to them
- Umbanda – Afro-Brazilian syncretic religion
- Zār – Demon or evil spirit in Middle East and Horn of African cultures
