= Hamadsha =

Possession rite practiced in Morocco

The Hamadsha is a pair of close Muslim fraternities (though it has male (called Hamdushi) and female (called Hamdushiyya) adherents) that practices a possession rite in Morocco, notably by some Black Moroccans, and using music influenced by Gnawa music. It is primarily therapeutic in nature, and either cures people of affliction or gives them a new social role to inhabit (or both). It may be described as a form of maraboutism, Muslim folk mysticism, which is popular in the Maghreb.

It is similar to the zar and Bori possession practices, with roots in Sufism. It was founded by the saints Sidi 'Ali ben Hamdush (his order being 'Allaliyyin) and Sidi Ahmed Dghugi (his order being Dghugiyyin). Sidi Ahmed was Sidi 'Ali's servant or slave. They are both buried near Meknes; Sidi 'Ali in a large tomb near Beni Rachid, and Sidi Ahmed in Beni Ouarad. About 1/6th of each village claims descent from the respective saint (or one of his brothers, in Sidi Ali's case, as he is often said to have died childless), as well as the Prophet, and called wulad siyyid (children of the saint) and shurfa (sing. sharif, a word denoting descent from the Prophet Muhammad). These descendents have the option of joining the Hamadsha, but they typically do not. Both the Gnawa and Hamadsha go on pilgrimage to Sidi 'Ali's tomb, at the same time, the week of mussem (the celebration of Muhammad's birth), though on different routes.

Those treated by the Hamadsha may also become members. Members usually consider themselves to be Sunni Muslims. The membership of the Hamadsha is subdivided into teams called taifa, which may have a specific meeting place called a zawiya.

== Spirits and possession ==
Possession is often linked to a figure named Aisha Qandicha or Lalla Aisha, who some treat like a jinn, and others vehemently do not. There are sometimes said to be four Aishas. She demands a sacrifice from the men she possesses- ritual bloodletting. Aisha Qandisha appears in the Egyptian zār as Aisha al-Maghribiya. Her colors are red and black.

Other spirits are also known to possess Hamadsha adherents. Some of these are also known to Gnawa practices; Sidi Hamu, Sidi Musa, and Sidi Mimun. Ceremonies are attended and sacrifices are performed to build relationships, maintain the benefits of baraka, and ward off the spirit causing trouble.

== Ceremonies ==
A brief account states that the ceremony upon discovering possession consists of gathering in a zeriba (a hut made of mats) where dances and chants occur. A sacrificial animal (such as a chicken or goat) is strangled and boiled without salt. This water is smeared on the walls and floor, and the meat of the animal is eaten by those present.

Other accounts state that the ceremony is held near the tomb of a saint, such as Sheikh al-Kamal, founder of the 'Isawiyya brotherhood (which has likely influenced the practices of the Hamadsha) and patron of Meknes. The dancing and music starts, and a musician asks for money from the gathered crowd. At first, the dance is more or less a group activity, but after some time, people split off. During these dances, possessed individuals may beat their chests or slash at their heads with knives. Helpers prevent people from going too far, and after they are done, the possessed may be asked to give baraka (blessings).

Ceremonies that begin in the evening and go on until morning may be called līla (nights). These begin with an entrance from the street (called 'āda or dakhla). The musicians warm their drums over a fire first, and play them as they walk through the procession towards the home or zawiya the ceremony is held in. Once they have entered, the 'āda ceases as possession oriented music, hadra, starts to be played. The musicians take their seat in a U shape, and do ritual chants (hizb) for around 20 minutes. After this are the al-ūnāsa al-kabīra, at-tṣiliyya, and al-ūnāsa al-ṣaghīra. The ūnāsa are poetry readings, with the kabīra being accompanied by drums and the ṣaghīra being accompanied by clapping. The tṣiliyya is a set of short songs. An intense hadra follows, inviting Aisha, and the final part of the ceremony, the saf al-gimbrī, starts. Possession starts in the hadra, and continues in the gimbrī (named for the central instrument).

The Gnawa also begin ceremonies with a dakhla or 'āda, and hold them either in the evening ('ashiya) or night (līla). They hold ceremonies to appease a spirit possessing someone, who they have a relationship with, and where a sacrifice occurs. They use incense and ritual clothing.

Baraka are, in a Sufi context, a kind of divine favor or miraculous power, used by saints to perform miracles, and how "the divine reaches into the world". One has baraka in the same way one has strength or intelligence, and some have it more than others- with saints having a great deal of it. It is not always positive. Baraka in the Hamadsha comes from the saints venerated in it.

Tombs of saints in Morocco are taken care of by their descendants, with the primary caretaker being called muqaddim, who visitors donate money to. Muqaddim are also involved in the rituals done by the Hamadsha.

== Music ==
Instruments played by the Hamadsha include large drums sych as the guwwāl, and smaller ones such as the t'arījāt, a ghīta (an oboe-like double reed instrument), and a gimbrī (a stringed instrument). Some of the songs used by the Hamadsha and Gnawa are also used in zār rites in Egypt.
