= Maguzawa Hausa people =

Ethnic group in Northern Nigeria

Maguzawa are a subcategory of the Hausa people. Most of the citizens are found in the rural areas close to Kano and Katsina and other parts of Northern Nigeria. They are known to have facial scarification similar to the early rulers of Kano and Katsina. In terms of culture, there are major differences between Muslim Hausas and the Maguzawa in terms of religion and social organization.

== History ==
According to tradition, the Maguzawa are in fact the original stock of the Hausa people. The Maguzawa were referenced in the Kano Chronicle to have existed since the earliest days of Kano over a millennia ago. The distinction between the Maguzawa and the rest of Kano's society began in the 14th century during the reign of Yaji I who along with Wangara Scholars were able to impose the Islamic faith on the people of Kano. While the religion of Islam continued to evolve to a more syncretic version which the Fula jihad sought to expunge, the Maguzawa and their religion became a separate faction in the State. They purely adhered to the oldest form of paganism while the Hausa rulers of Kano and most of their followers practiced a syncretic form of Islam which included elements from paganism. For example, one of the fetish items venerated in Kano before the Jihad was a Quran covered in goat or cow skin called "Dirki". The Hausa aristocracy were also known to have marabouts and Islamic scholars to call upon during their times of need. Nevertheless, while there were differences between the practices of the Maguzawa and the omnist version of Islam practised in these states, the Maguzawa remained a vital faction in the state and were often called upon to carry out pagan rituals by the Hausa kings. Very few of the Maguzawa remain today as most of them have converted to Islam and a small minority have converted to Christianity.

== Society ==
Farming was the leading occupation of Maguzawas but are known to engage in fishing, trading and rearing of domestic animals like goats and sheep. During the dry season, when farming activity is low, the men engage in dyeing, iron working and basketry. The female Maguzawa were known to be more independent, engaging in economic activity in direct contrast to the imported harem culture in neighbouring Islamic communities. Many women, both married and dependants engaged in trading. In terms of a socio-political organization, most Maguzawa communities are made up of scattered compounds and like their Hausa counterparts are led by a Sarki. However, predominant Maguzawa communities have three patrilineal cultural leaders. The Sarki'n Noma, who is the head of farming, the Sarki'n Arna, known as the head of the Pagans and the Sarki'n Dawa, the headman of the bush. The latter two heads or Sarkis share equal power. The Sarki'n Arna is usually given to the best beer drinker in the community while the defunct Sarki'n Dawa is the best hunter in the community.

== Religion ==
Maguzawa religion revolves around an infinite number of spirits or iskoki (singular - iska) in Hausa. This literally translates into 'WINDS' There are about 3,000 iskoki in the religion. However, the dominance of Islam in the region has diluted the original meaning of the Gods/spirits with the imposed Islamic canon, and they are also referred to today as Al-Jannu (singular Jinn) also known as the westernised 'Genie'. The Isoki are divided into two main categories : The Gona or "Farm spirits" who are tame and easier to manipulate, and the Daji or "Bush Spirits" who are untamed and much difficult to contact.

=== Six Major Spirits ===
Name	Relationships	Characteristics	Illness caused by
Sarkin Aljan "jinn king"	Husband of Mai'iyali	A black spirit; king of all the spirits	Headache
Mai'iyali "possessor of a family"	Wife of Sarkin 'Aljan	Has a large cloth to carry children	None
Waziri "vizier"	Vizier of Sarkin 'Aljan	Distributes the presents of Sarkin 'Aljan among the people	None
Babban Maza "great among men"	Husband of Inna	Uses a pestle	Loss of soul
Manzo "messenger"	Son of Babban Maza	A hairy dog who devours souls	Loss of soul
Bagiro	Son of Babban Maza;	Devours souls	Loss of soul
