= Hausa animism =

Religion of Hausa people in West Africa

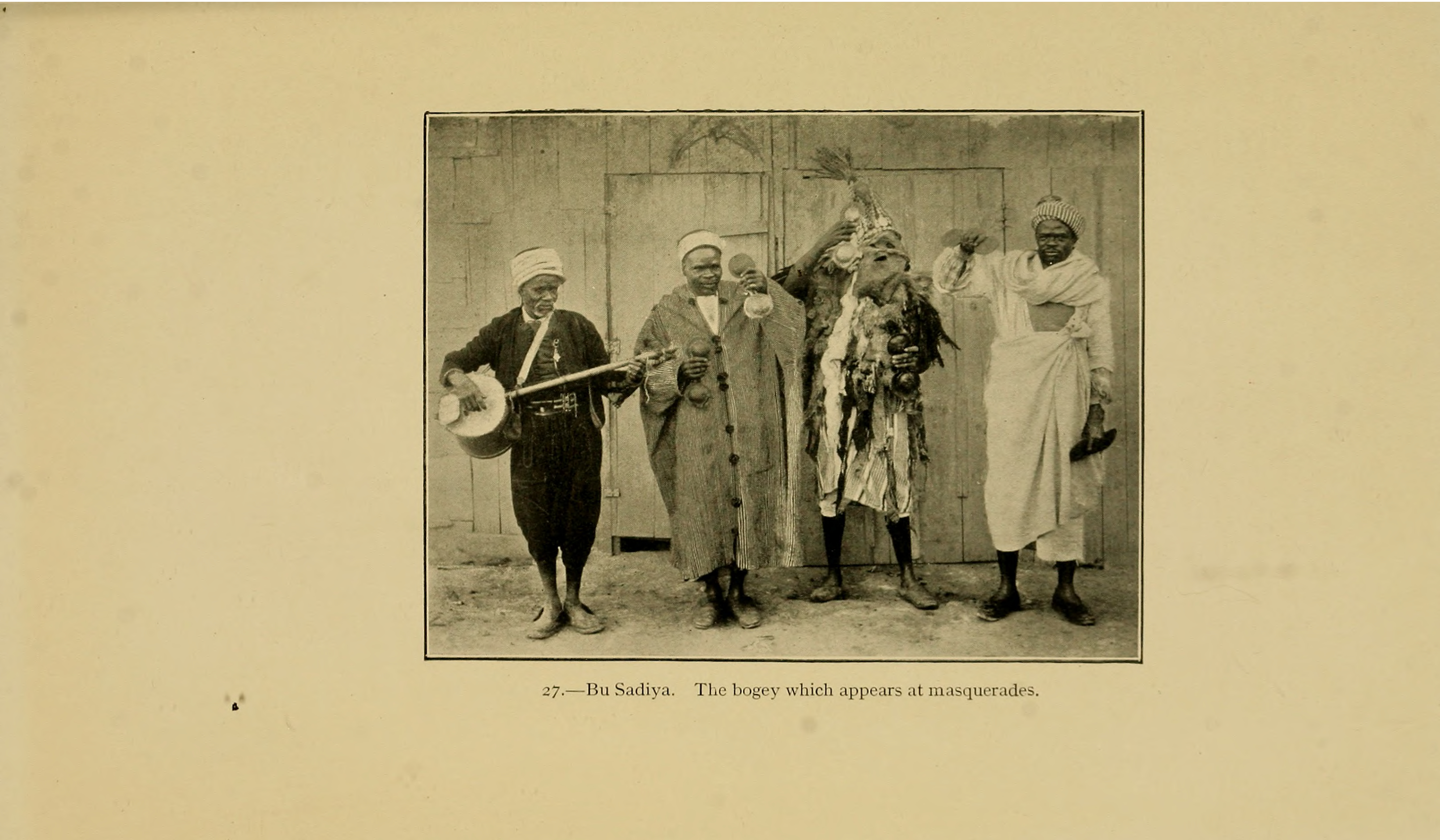
Musicians with guembris and krakebs, one masquerading as Bu-Sadiya, a bogey.

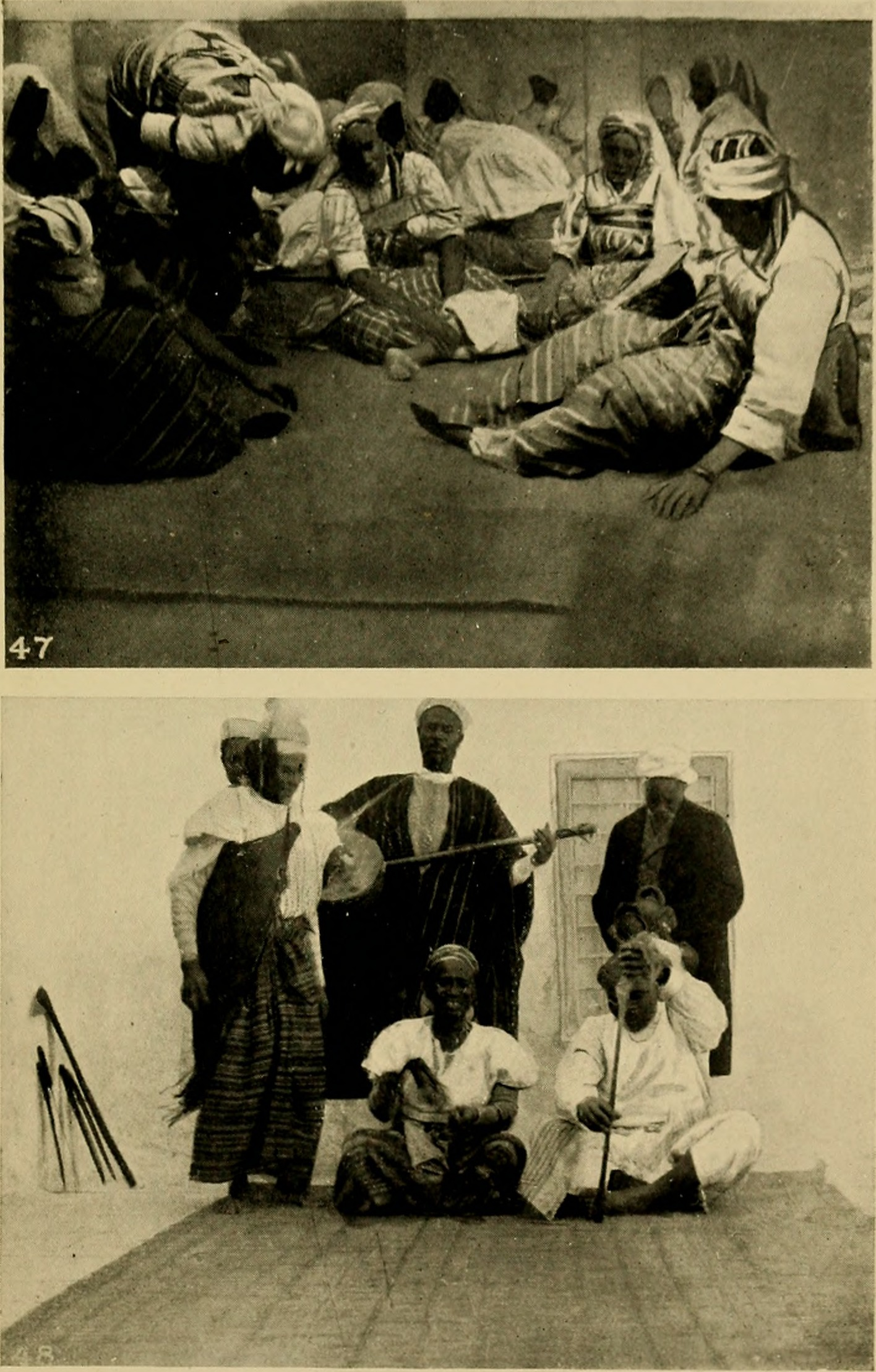
Photos of musicians affiliated with the Yan Bori

Hausa animism, Maguzanci or Bori is a pre-Islamic traditional religion of the Hausa people of West Africa that involves magic and spirit possession. While only a part of the Hausa people (mostly within urban elites) converted to Islam before the end of the 18th century, most of the adherents of the religion did the same between the jihad started by the Islamic reformer Usman dan Fodio around 1800 and the beginning of the 20th century, while a small minority converted to Christianity. Religious affiliation to this traditional religion is virtually nonexistent at the beginning of the 21st century; however, Hausa animism and Islam among Hausa people have coexisted for centuries, and some practices related to animism carry on locally.

When discussing "bori", there is a distinction to be made between the beliefs of the Manguzawa (which consist of pagan or heavily pagan influenced Hausa religion), the general belief in spirits and animism that persists even among Muslim Hausa, and the possession-trance group that puts on dance performances and ceremonies.

== Terminology ==
Bòòríí is a Hausa noun, meaning the spiritual force that resides in physical things, and is related to the word for local distilled alcohol (borassa) as well the practice of medicine (boka). The Bori religion is both an institution to control these forces, and the performance of an "adorcism" (as opposed to exorcism) ritual, dance and music by which these spirits are controlled and by which illness is healed.

Spirits are called bori, iska (plu. iskoki), or aljan. Iska has a non-Muslim connotation, so many Muslim Hausa prefer to use the term aljan, which comes from the Arabic word jinn.

Possessing spirits in the possession-trance group are called the spirit(s) "on (your) head". Possession-trance group members are called yan bori (children of the bori), dam bori (son of the bori), yar bori (daughter of the bori), doki (horse) for male devotees, and godiya (mare) for female devotees. Attendants who help the yam bori but don't trance are called masu kiwo (herders or grooms), and help them get dressed and keep the spectators safe.

Musicians may generally be called maroka, though more specific terms exist. Female musicians are called zabiyoyi. A mawaki is a vocalist. A mabushi is a wind instrument player. A makadi is a drummer. The female chorus at bori events is called the Yan Kwarya whether they are professional musicians or not.

== Pre-Islamic Hausaland ==
According to Abdullahi Smith, the high god of Hausa animism was called Ubangiji, and spirits among people iskoki, which communities sought to maintain good relations with. Rituals were led by priests (bokaye), family heads, and on occasion the sarki (king).

An aspect of the traditional Maguzawa Hausa people's religious traditions, Bori became a state religion led by ruling-class priestesses among some of the late precolonial Hausa Kingdoms. When Islam started making inroads into Hausaland in the 11th century, certain aspects of the religion such as idol worship were driven underground. The cult of Tsumbubura in the then-Sultanate of Kano and many other similar Bori cults were suppressed, but Bori survived in "spirit-possession" cults by integrating some aspects of Islam. The Bori spirit possession priestesses maintained nominal influence over the Sultanates that replaced the earlier Animist kingdoms. Priestesses communed with spirits through ecstatic dance ritual, hoping to guide and maintain the state's ruling houses. A corps of Bori priestesses and their helpers was led by royal priestess, titled the Inna, or "Mother of us all". The Inna oversaw this network, which was not only responsible for protecting society from malevolent forces through possession dances, but which provided healing and divination throughout the kingdom.

== Post-Islamic and contemporary practice ==
=== History ===
Muslim scholars of the early 19th century disapproved of the hybrid religion practised in royal courts; zealous Muslims were to use this hybridization as an excuse to overthrow the Sultanates and form the Sokoto Caliphate. With the birth of the Caliphate, Bori practices were partially suppressed in Fula courts. Bori possession rituals survived in the Hausa refugee states such as Konni and Dogondutchi (in what is today southern Niger) and in some rural areas of Nigerian Hausaland. The powerful advisory roles of women, exemplified in the Bori priestesses, either disappeared or were transferred to Muslim women in scholarly, educational, and community leadership roles. British and French colonialism, though, offered little space for women in the official hierarchies of indirect rule, and the formal roles, like the Bori, for women in governance largely disappeared by the mid 20th century.

In modern Muslim Hausaland, Bori ritual survives in some places assimilated into syncretic practices. The ranks of the pre-Muslim "babbaku" spirits of the Maguzaci have been augmented over time with "Muslim" spirits ("farfaru"), and spirits of (or representing) other ethnic groups, even those of the European colonialists. The healing and "luck" aspects of the performances of Bori members (almost exclusively women) provide new social roles for their rituals and practitioners. Bori ritual societies, separated from governing structures, provide a powerful corporate identity for the women who belong to them through the practice of traditional healing, as well as through the performance of Bori festival like the girka initiation ritual. The possession-trance group is only one aspect of the Maguzawa religious practice, and it is the major one that has held on in Muslim communities.

=== Beliefs ===
The beliefs espoused by Bori-Islam about a person are similar to the multipart soul concept found in other cultures. In the body of each person, there is the soul, residing in the heart, and the life, which wanders about inside the body. They have a bori of the same sex, which is an intermediary between the human and the jinn. Between puberty and marriage, most have a second bori, of the opposite sex, which most be consulted before marriage to prevent the fallout of its jealousy, as it has intercourse with the human as they sleep. In addition to all this, there are two angels over a person's left and right shoulders, recording their evil and good thoughts.

The Manguzawa are either not Muslim, or are considered to have only superficially converted. Allah is considered distant, with the iskoki (spirits) instead being the active supernatural force in people's lives. The Maguzawa theology is monotheistic in the sense that one being controls the universe. Today this is Allah, but before Islam this role may have been filled by Sarkin Aljan, who is the head of the bori and the city Jangare even today. The spirits serve as intermediaries between humans and the divine creator. There are four main elements to their beliefs: family rituals, public rituals, individual aspects, and possession-trance rites.

- The family rituals are done by the Mai-Gida (head of the patrilineal extended family that works the same ancestral land, gandu), in connection to agricultural events and marriages. It consists of sacrifices made to the inherited iskoki spirits, with them drinking the blood, and the sacrifices eating the meat or giving it as alms. The family rituals are not done by urban Muslim Hausa.
- The public rituals have fallen out of favor.
- The individual aspects are mostly sacrifices done for personal ends. The socially acceptable of these are offerings done by groups to the relevant spirits to ensure their cooperation in their occupation, and offerings prescribed by a boka to remedy spirit caused ailments. Some may also do sacrifices to evil spirits (dodo) to get help in committing nefarious deeds.
- The possession-trance group among the Maguzawa is simpler and less prominent. Its ceremonies are tied to specific events and crises. Each clan has one spirit that is "on the heads" of all members, but some individuals may be possessed by other spirits as well.

==== Spirits ====
There are many spirits connected to people, animals, plants, and big rocks. The two personal ("friendly") bori are like the qarin, which does not come into being until after the person it is attached to is born, as that is when a person's sex is known (one of these qarin-like spirit is of the opposite sex). All these- people, animals, plants, and big rocks- have a permanent soul (quruwa), two attendant angels, and a bori of the same sex.

There are other bori not directly connected to living people, such as those which are or are inspired by Muslim saints, well known jinn, embodiments of other tribes, ancestors, the spirits of infants, totems (such as animals), and gods. The bori are like humans, but they are not human, and they are not visible in human cities. They are considered both above humans, in heaven (because they are sometimes conflated with angels), and below humans in the earth. The bori, like people, keep cattle, though this does not prevent them from bothering human herds. Many of the bori belong to 12 families or "houses". Bori are considered to be like the people they live among. The names, characteristics, favorite resting places, appropriate sacrifices, and more of the spirits form the basis of ritual practice. The rosters of known Bori spirits and their behaviors tend to remain the same, and the spirits stay relevant, though their genealogies may change. Spirits are often divided into "white" or "black", which mostly overlaps with the categories of "Muslim" and "pagan", and the categories of "town" and "bush". However, a Muslim spirit may be called black if it causes certain afflictions, such as paralysis. The black/white and Muslim/pagan distinction seems to be Muslim in origin, while the town/bush distinction seems to have been native, and location based identification is more prominent.

In Kano, Jangare, the city in which the Bori live, is ruled by a "Court of the East", with Sarkin Aljan as the head, and is a centralized authority compared to others' accounts of a more mild feudal organization. In Ningi, he is the ultimate head and divides authority with the heads of the other houses. Everyone agrees that there are 12 houses, but they do not agree on who rules or is part of them. Houses are generally said to be ruled by a first born, and spirits are grouped by ethnicity, occupation, and descent. This becomes complicated as relational terms used for spirits are vague, and spirits practice a complex system of child avoidance and adoption. The basic information is contained in praise-epithets, songs, and spirit behavior at ceremonies, but is interpreted differently. Though these interpretations vary between different people, each person is consistent about their own recounting. The houses are linked by adoption, clientship, office, kinship, and affinity. For example, the Fulani house is linked to all other houses via marriage, and occasionally through the marriages of the offspring of brothers and half brothers. The other spirits tend to endogamy.

These spirits can cause illness and are placated with offerings, sacrifices, dances, and possession rites where dancers specially prepare to ensure being "ridden" has no ill effects. Their permission must be asked before constructing buildings, and neglect and unintentional slights may anger them. They can be entreated to help in tasks, such as finding treasure, and with solving fertility issues. In the latter case, the bori ask God's permission to intervene. The bori are everywhere, but are more concentrated near temples, within which they can be imprisoned. Certain bori may prefer to stay in specific areas, such as drains. Specific bori are associated with causing specific ailments. They are also associated with specific plants and specific types of soil, which are used medically to cure spirit ailments. They are associated with specific songs, and typically have more than one. The spirits will not ride their mounts without music, and this music may be as simple as hand clapping.

Malady and manifestation are the two main methods of communication the bori have. The former allows them to communicate their anger at being ignored or offended. The latter allows them self-expression, and in the case of one origin story of the bori, functions as a family reunion.

Incense attracts the bori, and they do not like iron. Fire is not a bori, and bori do not like fires or live in them, as it would burn them. However, the bori can simply go over fires, so fire is not a ward against them. It is considered good to give as much of an offering as one can afford, because the bori love the generous and take care of them.

The bori get sustenance from blood, and sacrifices are quick ways to get their attention. The blood must be collected in one spot on the ground, preferably near a tree a particular bori is known to rest in.

Precautions are taken so that unfriendly bori do not possess fetuses. One method to protect newborns is to buy a black hen at around 7 months of pregnancy, and to keep it in the house until the baby is born. It is thought that any bori lingering will possess it and lie in wait for the birth. It is then set free in the Jewish quarter to get rid of the unfriendly bori. This method is borrowed from Arabs. A young child may be protected by their mother calling them Angulu (vulture, which bori are thought to find disgusting, though this is also the name of a bori), and acting as though she'd be glad of her child was gone, as bori take children to punish their mothers.

If a person yawns without covering their mouth, they must spit afterwards, as doing so may accidentally cause one to let in a bori. Sneezing is thought to expel a bori that has entered someone without their knowledge, and this is part of why a person gives thanks to God after they sneeze. For this reason, the bori do not like pepper. The sound of laughter attracts the bori, the merriment of laughing excites them, and the open mouth, just as with yawning, allows them entry.

One story of the creation of the bori spirits says that God created everything, and at first the bori did not exist. However, some people did wicked things, and God turned some of these people into half men-half fish, and the rest were turned into bori. They were further cursed to stay in the same state; old bori never die, and young bori never age to become old. Another story is similar to the Ethiopian and Omani story of the origin of zār spirits; a Hausa family with many children tried to hide half of them from God. This angered God, who turned them into hungry spirits that can only be appeased with blood sacrifices. Possession in this context is a family reunion that restores health and balance (lafiya), and spirit and human are complementary opposites.

For the bori possession-trance group, affliction by spirits, even if it was caused by one committing a transgression, is a mark that someone was chosen by the spirits to become a horse for the spirits or gods. The illnesses they treat include clumsiness, impotence, infertility, rashes, boils, gastrointestinal trouble, headaches, insanity, leprosy, and paralysis.

House	Description
zauren Sarkin Aljan Sulemanu	House of the Ultimate Chief of the Spirits, the one which may sometimes be only referred to as Sarkin Aljan. It has subsections for blind spirits (zauren makafi), the Chief's bodyguards (zauren dogarai), and the metal smiths (zauren makera). There are four subsections overall, which each have their own leader underneath the house head. This set up is standard for all houses with subsections. Sulemanu's own subsection contains his wives, and his younger brother's children (which he's adopted), his own son's children (who were adopted by one of his stepsons), and additionally, titled officials and their slaves. The smiths live with him so he can control the goods they make, which include weapons.
zauren Sarkin Aljan Biddarene	The house of a chief of the spirits, Biddarene; a younger brother of the Ultimate Chief of the Spirits, Sulemanu.
zauren malamai	The house of the Malams, Quran teachers and scholars. The head of this house is Malam Alhaji (Malam, the Pilgrim); a younger brother of Sarkin Aljan Sulemanu.
zauren kutare	The house of the lepers. The head of this house is usually either Kuge or his son Kuturu, the latter of which is Sarkin Aljan Sulemanu's senior councillor (Madaki). This house has a subsection for snakes (zauren macizai).
zauren Filani	The house of the Fulani. This house's head is Sarkin Filani Dukko (the Chief of the Fulani, Dukko)
zauren Sarkin Aljan Zurkalene	The house of a chief of the spirits, Zurkalene; a younger brother of Sarkin Filani. This house includes a subsection for butchers (zauren mahauta) and musicians (zauren maroka)
zauren Sarkin Aljan Shekaratafe	The house of a chief of the spirits, Shekaratafe. These spirits are said to live in water.
zauren maharba	The house of the hunters. This house is headed by the Owner of the Bush, Mai Dawa. It includes a subsection for Tuareg serfs (zauren buzaye).
zauren Sarkin Givari	the house of the Chief of Gwari—a ‘pagan’ group.
zauren Sarkin Arna	The house of the Chief of Pagans.
zauren Turawa	the house of the North Africans.
zauren mayu	The house of sorcerers. This house is headed by Batoyi.

Known bori include:

- Angulu.
- Auta, or Kulita, "the one who puts an end to birth". After a woman ceases to bear children (usually 4 or 5 years after her last one), she calls her youngest Auta, as this bori has visited her.
- Buba is the son of Sarkin Filani, but he is treated more like a grandson, being joked with by Sarkin Filani instead of avoided, and this has made him immature. He is not demanding but cries at ceremonies if he can't find his parents or runs away.
- Bagwariya is thought to be an unusual choice in wife for a pious man such as Malam Alhaji. Some explain this by saying jinn are known to make strange decisions. Others say she was given to Sarkin Aljan by her father, and he gave her to Malam Alhaji, paying the bride price but not marrying her himself. She is a stereotype of the Gwari, being a pagan who does not conform to a halal diet. This, and not her ailments, makes her a black spirit. She eats constantly, particularly dogs and bushmeat, and prefers carrion. She does not like food with peppers. She suffers from a humpback and goitre, and causes these in people, though she is rarely the primary spirit to cause illness- typically she joins in after others. She is influential over her husband and Dan Galadima, and can persuade them to end the affliction of a patient. As a black spirit, only black animals are appropriate for her, usually a chicken or goat. Cooked beans may be substituted for the blood sacrifice. Her song comes after her husband's and has a disjointed sound to match her gait.
- Baidu is a spirit of the Fulani house, younger brother to Sarkin Filani and Zurkalene. He is not very active among the Yan Bori.
- Ba-Toye, who sets fire to houses and burns people.
- Barade, also called Sumba, Safiyanu, Sufi, and Sarkin Yaki (Chief of war) is the adopted son of Biddarene. He is the biological son of Sarkin Aljan. He is enthusiastic in battle, but particular and sulky. He causes hemophilia and internal bleeding, which is accompanied by a feverish feeling and heartburn. He wears white, so a white cock or ram is the appropriate sacrifice. In addition to the white body cloth, his mounts wear a medicine belt, an empty sword sling, and carry a short spear or stick. He arrives after Sarkin Rafi at performances, and they dance together doing jifa.
- Barhaza is the younger sister of Sarkin Filani and belongs to the house of the hunters. She is sometimes married to the head, who has a household of 8. She is varyingly said to be married to Kure, Mai Gizo, and Mai Dawa. She causes paralysis and usually targets women. She may also cause sleepwalking and aimless wandering, aching stomachs and heads, and impotence. When these other afflictions occur in combination, and with paralysis or numbness on one side of the body, she is identified as responsible. Her sacrifice is a white sheep, and her medicine includes milk from a white cow and a white goat. She and her mounts wear white, cowrie head adornments, and silver bracelets. Her mounts at ceremonies mime milking and churning. She is shy, and her mounts must be attended to ensure they don't run away from ceremonies if startled.
- Dan Galadima, or Yerima, who is often known as the son of Alhaji and Bagwariya. When his parents aren't specifically mentioned, he is known as the son of a chief or king. He is generous to a fault, and sometimes a gambler. This generousity makes him a favorite at performances, and is seen as exemplary. He typically causes the maladies of fever and weightloss. Dan Galadima is sometimes recounted as the adopted son of Sarkin Aljan Sulemanu and Inna. Yan Bori as of the 1970s held he was the biological son of Biddarene. Any of the three brother spirits can be described as his father in accordance to Hausa custom. Dan Galadima has four wives and one concubine: ’Yar Mairo (who is the daughter of a musician), Ciwo Babu Magani (Illness with no Medicine: the daughter of a sorcerer), Ci Goro (Eat Kolanuts), Azurfa (Silver), and Mai Fitila (Owner of a Lamp; his concubine). All their children were adopted by Sarkin Rafi, his father's brother's son. In turn, he adopted his male parallel cousin's children. Each set of children by result lives with their biological grandparents. He makes his mounts compulsively give away their wealth and possessions, though it is believed they will return with interest. His generosity is considered a positive in Hausa culture, but excessive gambling is an embarrassment and a nuisance. A red cock with a saddle shaped marking on its back is the lesser sacrifice to him, and a ram with black rings around the eyes is the greater. His medicines include the parts from these animals and sweet or fragrant plants or perfumes. His mounts sit and throw cowries, as though gambling, dance in a whirling motion, or do jifa. He must be allowed three jifa jumps and then be gently restrained by stepping on his leg or clothing. He may attempt to give parts of his costume to others around him, which attendants try to prevent so they don't have to rush about retrieving the items. His mounts are covered with a saki (blue and black checked cloth) when he is called, which is used as a cape when they are in trance. Once in trance he is given a turban, a small fan, kola nuts, a handkerchief with cowries for gambling, and bottles of perfume that are sprayed on his clothes.
- Danko Dan Musa, a snake spirit who causes stomach trouble. Danko belongs to the house of the lepers and is leader of the snake spirits. He is also called just Danko, just Dan Musa, Samami, or Majaciki. He lives in the water of rivers and wells, and caution must be taken in those places, both with snakes and with strange men. He is either young as he is not mentioned to have a wife or children, or middle aged due to his status. The latter interpretation holds to an oral tradition not found in his praise-epithets that his wife is Kwakiya (Black-Hooded Cobra), his biological son is Damatsiri (type of harmless, green snake), and adopted his adopted son is Masharuwa (Drinker of Water). He is said to be very wealthy, and may grant wealth to others, though this can have unforeseen negative consequences. He is powerful and dangerous. He is considered a white spirit, since he is not specifically a pagan. He causes stomach aches, infertility (which snakes are thought to be linked to), and blindness. Only a black animal, typically a goat or cock, is fit to sacrifice for him because he wears black or indigo. His mounts at ceremonies imitate serpentine movements, crawling and rising like cobras. He consumes raw eggs and liver voraciously through them. He may ride mounts without invitation, and attempts are usually made to persuade him to leave and come back when preparations have actually been made for him. It does not take much effort for his mounts to enter trance.
- Duna, also called Baleri, is married to Ladi Mayya, who is also sometimes called Zakoma. They have three children, Kure, Ciwo Babu Magani (Dan Galadima's wife) and Manzo Maye, who has remained in his house. Duna is Shekaratafe's brother. He is a black spirit (being a non-Muslim) and a sorcerer. He is a skilled archer, and his arrows cause infertility in women. He appears late at night and in dreams, standing like a hyena with black monkey hair hanging over his face (though he is neither animal). He wears all black, which he uses as camouflage. He rarely fully possesses people (which would cause them to be initiated), though he gives many nightmares and afflicts them with his arrows. His mounts at ceremonies mime the motions of archery.
- Hajjo is Ja'e's daughter and married to a Fulani man.
- Hawa’u, also known as Gurgunya (Lame Woman) is Sarkin Filani's sister and married to Kure.
- Inna (Mother in Fulani), also called Hadiza (her personal name) Bafilatana, Doguwa Ta Kivance (Tall-Woman of Lying-Down), Bakar Doguwa (the Black Tall-Woman), or Doguwar Baka, is the mother of Danko and Sarkin Aljan Sulemanu's wife. She and her sister/co-wife are sisters of Sarkin Filani. She has an adulterous relationship with Kuturu. As such during bori ceremonies it is carefully planned that Inna and Kuturu do not appear together, which would anger Sarkin Aljan. The six sons which were adopted out were from her. As a spirit identified as Fulani, her behavior is a stereotype of how the Hausa perceive the Fulani. The Maguzawa call her the mother of all spirits, but in Kano, this honor goes to Magajiyar Jangare. The Manguzawa say she punishes those who steal from her worshippers with fatal abdominal swelling. Like all female Fulani spirits in the Bori, she is said to cause paralysis. A specific presentation of paralysis is attributed to her, which grows worse within days and may quickly result in death. Treatment by the Yan Bori is considered crucial and must be done quickly. A black chicken or goat is sacrificed to her. If this does not work, the patient is initiated and given a special potion to drink. Mount behaviors include miming milking motions, twirling a churning stick with drinking milk from a gourd and spitting, or staying close to the ground with one hand bent close to the body and shaking.
- Ja'e is the younger brother of Sarkin Filani and Sarkin Aljan Zurkalene, and serves as the latter's senior councillor in his house.
- Kuturu, the Leper. He is the senior councillor to Sarkin Aljan and the adulterous lover of Inna/Doguwa. He is also called Uban Dawaki, Goje, Kaura, Kyadi, or Sautau. He spends much of his time at the main gate of the palace. His wife is Almajira. Kure also has a relationship with Doguwa, and as such Kuturu dislikes showing up at ceremonies where he is present due to mutual jealousy. He is fearsome as senior councillor, but amusing as a nasal voiced and impatient Leper attempting to build a market stall. Though this may be amusing to some, he watches those who laugh. He takes what's given to him as alms, and is a generous gift giver. He warns his prospective mounts with fever and swelling before leprosy strikes them. His sacrifices are an ugly ruffled chicken or a particular type of red and white goat. The leaves and roots of the dundu, a favored resting place of his, are used in medicine for his ailments. At ceremonies his mounts act like lepers and compulsively beg for alms. Attendants are careful to remove rings from his mounts as their fingers may close up on their palms and freeze, and any rings may cause injuries. Their noses run and mouths contort, crawling with immobile, bent feet and ankles. His arms flail, looking like he is itching, but really as a display of power. He and his mounts dominate the ceremonies unless Sarkin Aljan is present. His mounts wear a red fez and leather apron, which they must be helped with, a woven grass bag and a warty gourd for food and alms. He has a fly switch and a string weapon made from dum palm nut.
- Kuri, or Kure, whose name is from "kura" (hyena). Brother of Doguwar Baka. Sometimes is the son of Barhaza and adopted by Sarkin Filani. Also sometimes called Kura. Kure leads the butchers in Zurkalene's house. He prowls around the gates of Sarkin Aljan's house at night, and in the human world will in general be encountered at night and near the pakace gates of kings. He was born to Sarkin Fagan. He is married to Hawa’u, and Maimuna and Amina, who are the daughters of the previous chief of butchers. This previous chief recommended Kure for the position. He has three biological children. His daughter, Zainaba, still lives with him, but his sons, Bako Mashi (Guest Spear) and Masharuwa (Drinker of Water), were adopted by Danko. Kure is fearsome. He causes headaches, strangulation, and nose bleeds. A red cock or goat is an appropriate sacrifice, and his medicines include things for washing and drinking. His mounts rage in front of the musicians, prowling, snarling, and drooling and snapping at any who come near. A leash is tied to them by an attendant, who holds onto it to keep the audience calm.
- Kwakiya causes blindness like her husband, and is said to have taught him how to do so. She is an adopted daughter of Zurkalene.
- Magajiyar Jangare is the wife of Sarkin Aljan Biddarene. She is the spiritual mother of all the Yan Bori, and not easily angered. She is the most important spirit in Kano, but rarely mentioned anywhere else. This is because elsewhere, mounts fall into trance one at a time, with each spirit being called by their own song. In Kano, however, all mounts fall into trance at once to the same music- her music, which serves as a vehicle for the other spirits. She rarely has her own mounts. She causes headaches, pneumonia, impotence. Her sacrifice is a white hen or sheep.
- Labuda is Sarkin Filani's sister and married Zaki (Lion).
- Mai-Chibi, who gives babies umbilical hernias.
- Mai Dawa, also known as Mai Baka, Adamu, or Gajere, is the head of the house of archers. The house has an affinity with the Fulani spirits. His father is sometimes said to be Baleri, and his mother is sometimes said to be Inna (this being the same kind of idiomatic statement used regarding Dan Galadima's parentage), but his wife is sometimes said to be Barhaza (sister of Inna), and the Yan Bori state thy don't believe even a spirit would marry his mother's sister. Some praise-epithets instead name his wives as Iyani and Awali. He is a fearless expert hunter, and tall when standing, but outside his home he always crouches. He causes unexplained bleeding, usually preceded by a cold and catarrh and then progressing to coughing up blood. His sacrifices are a short legged cock or black and brown male goat. Some of his arrows are "poisoned", meaning the affliction they cause won't be cured by sacrifice or initiation, but this is rare. At ceremonies his mounts mime archery, chopping undergrowth, and slaying animals, all while crouching. He dresses in black, with a tall hat that folds back to rest on the back of the neck and a leather apron. His black dress makes hik a black spirit. His mounts are usually given a broad ax and a bow and arrows.
- Mai Gizo (Owner of Matted Hair) is Sarkin Filani's son and was adopted by the house of the pagans because of his evil behavior and renouncing Islam. He is also called Yero. His hair is tangled, he does not shave, he refuses to bathe, he smells, his skin is rough, and his teeth are black or missing. He is a black spirit, both as a non-Muslim and a non-town spirit. He causes people to be unclean and renounce Islam, as well as headaches and insanity. He is difficult to appease. His sacrifices are a black male goat or cock. His mounts dress in skins at ceremonies and are given axes that they dance with.
- Mai-Inna.
- Mai Iyali (Owner of a family) is a spirit of a contentious identity. Some have accounted this spirit as female and married to Sarkin Aljan, and some have further identified this spirit with Magajiyar Jangare. In Kano they insist this spirit is male, also called Kunnau or Ali, and the brother of Sarkin Rafi. This spirit is also regarded as male in Katsina.
- Malam Alhaji, who is pious and well read. Some recount him as the father of Dan Galadima. He is the head of Zauren Malamai, and either has two wives or a wife and a concubine. His first wife, Kuri, had three sons, the oldest being Nakada, who is evil and now lives in the pagan house. His other wife or concubine, Arziki, also called Bagwariya (the Gwari woman), was originally of the pagan house and some believe she affected Nakada's temperament. He causes chronic coughing. His sacrifices are white unblemished animals, preferably a ram but sometimes a cock. Other spirits have special medicine belts, but his medical formulae are Quran verses. His mounts do not dance, but instead sit and write, read, pray, or pull their rosary beads. His mounts dress in white with a red fez and sit on a ramskin mat, all of which together are quite expensive.
- Na Matuwa is the son of Sarkin Filani. He seduces any woman he finds alone, and is difficult but redeemable enough that he hasn't been sent to live with the pagans.
- Nakada is the son of Malam Alhaji who renounced Islam. He is lacking in virtues, rude, an arsonist, and has a foul temper. He may cause madness in patients, but more common is eating excrement and hypersexuality. His mounts dance lewdly, dressed in clothes of fishing nets and monkey skins, with a tail tied on and a stick between their legs. He is the last spirit called as he closes the door that Sarkin Makada opens.
- Nana'aishe causes stomach ailments and itching.
- Sa'idi.
- Sambo is the son of Sarkin Filani. He appears often in small urban areas and causes people to wander around the bush.
- Sarkin Aljan, the chief of spirits who rules Jangare. He may also be called Sarkin Aljan Sulemanu. A story of Sarkin Aljan tells of him riding in a nighttime procession before the morning of Id al-Kabir headed for a tree (Kukar Makau), where the spirits were said to live, criminals were executed, and madmen cured. A royal servant was awakened by this, and assuming it was his human Sarkin riding, joined the parade. He realized his mistake, but touched the Sarkin Aljan. This drove him mad, and he died not long after. Sarkin Aljan is thought to be the adopted son of Taiki and Mabuga, two inactive spirits. He is the older brother of Biddarene and Malam Alhaji, each of which are house heads. His wives are Fulani sisters. All six of his sons have been adopted by Biddarene, who gave Sulemanu his own six sons in return. He in turn adopted his grandchildren, who were born in Biddarene's house. Grandchildren and grandparents are considered "joking relatives" by the Hausa, while parents and children are meant to avoid each other. Two stories are told of how Sulemanu became the ruler of Jangare. Muslims say he was appointed by Allah, and the Prophet Sulemanu tied the turban around the spirit Sulemanu's head. Those who are less Islamized say he simply stepped up to the position and appointed the other house heads. He is described as causing headaches. A bull of any color is the best sacrifice, but a white ram is also acceptable. The medicines for treating his mounts are rare or expensive- parts from animals that are difficult to hunt, items filling circumstances which rarely occur. His mounts are bossy, act distant, and haughty, though they are expected to restrain this behavior outside of trance. While possessed they have a chiefly posture and may rock while seated. Attendants usually fan ostrich plume fans around them. The costume items must be of the best quality, consisting of a gown, trousers, shirt, shoes, staff, prayer beads, and fans.
- Sarkin Aljan Zurkalene, head of zaren Sarkin Aljan Zurkalene, is the younger brother of the head of the Fulani spirits. He has a household of 6. He has a horn in the middle of his head, and at present never possesses people. He left Sarkin Filani's house because he was displeased with prospects there, and brought his younger brother Ja'e' with him to serve as his councillor. He married the sister of Shekaratafe, Kasa, adopted two of his children and two of his brothers children.
- Sarkin Arna is the head of the house of the pagans. He has at least three wives. He is an alcoholic, and causes this ailment in patients, as well as causing them to renounce Islam. His mounts dance like drunkards with disconnected movements and collapse to the ground.
- Sarkin Filani, also called Mai Ruga Dukko, or Hardo, has 4 wives and 10 children. He watches over herds. He causes his prospective mounts to become nomadic, to the point where they refuse to sit. They often find a stick like herders use and carry it around. They will only eat cassava and cakes made of ground nuts. He also causes scrotal hernias. He prefers white animals, and only the best cock or ram is appropriate. He rarely afflicts people, and usually the sacrifice is medicine enough.
- Sarkin Makada is also called Dafau, Madi, Abdullahi, and various other names. He is the son of Abamu and grandson of Karbo. His wife is Zabiya, and they have 5 children, one of whom is Dan Galadima's principal wife. He leads the musicians in Zurkalene's house. He spends a lot of time at Sarkin Aljan's house as a courtier. During Yan Bori ceremonies, he comes first and opens the door for the other spirits. Like any proper maroka, he clears the way for and announces the presence of his leaders. He is thought to bear too many responsibilities. He is expert musician, and no one, spirit or human, can match him. His ailments are related to music, such as sore shoulders and throat problems. While other spirits have an inferior and superior sacrifice, both of his (a red and white goat or red cock) are equal in his eyes. He may attempt to strangle his own mounts while in trance, but this is unusual and extreme, and considered a mistreatment of the mount. He mimes playing music and will often sing for the other spirits present. He also prefers female mounts.
- Sarkin Rafi, also called Ibrahim, Shari, Zugu, or Totsi. He is the chief of well watered land, whose personality is mad, angry, and violent. He is the husband of Nana (aka Nana'aishe) and brother of Ali, who may also known as Mai Iyali. He is the brother of Barade. He is the adopted son of Biddarene, and biological son of Sarkin Aljan. He has an adulterous relationship with Badakuwa, his younger brother's wife. He and Dan Galadima are parallel cousins and have adopted each other's children. He is summoned at the annual harvest and dances with leaps, landing on his bottom. This style of jump is called jifa. He causes madness and unsocial behavio. His sacrifices are a speckled cock, a black and white ram, or a duck in any color. Patients spend months or years being treated with various medicines. Mounts at ceremonies mime mounting horses as the horse violently coughs, retches, and vomits or froths at mouth and nose. He makes them scoop up dirt to pour over their heads and rub into their eyes. He screams and mimes swimming, and jumps into nearby water or mud. People at ceremonies are careful not to block his path, as he may become violent. During the harvest festival, a large pumpkin is brought out, and he breaks it by landing on it with a jifa leap. The pieces are distributed among the Yan Bori. As the brother of Barade, they travel together, help each other cause ailments, and mounts often serve them both.
- Shekaratafe, also called Sarkin Fagan, in not a very active spirit. He lives in the water, is married to Harakwai, and has at least 8 children. His mounts, when possessed, sit under a canopy and do not dance.
- Tsatsuba is the daughter of Barhaza and was adopted by Sarkin Filani.
- The Tundara, a bori in the shape of a spotted snake who may drink milk from a mother to prevent her from feeding a baby.
- Wanzami is the son of Barhaza and holds office as a Muslim Judge that gives him a relationship to Dan Galadima. Wanzami was appointed Alkalin Jangare (Judge of Jangare) by Sulemanu, and his first act was to turban Sulemanu as the Ultimate Chief of the Spirits. Some say he serves Sulemanu and is a close friend of Dan Galadima; others say he serves Dan Galadima. He was born in the house of the hunters as the first born son of Mai Dawa and Barhaza. He was adopted by his uncle, Sarkin Filani, and left his house to serve Sarkin Aljan. He is also a barber, circumsizer, and scarifier, and at times this is emphasized over his position as a judge. He causes baldness, shaving rashes, and difficulty healing after surgery. He wears red, and as such his sacrifice is a male red goat or a red cock. The infusion to treat his illnesses has ten items, including blood from the heart of a cow (because he is Fulani) and items representing his kin. His mounts do jifa and mimicry of shaving, with periods of inactivity where he is said to be acting like a judge. He often shows up at events where Dan Galadima is present, as they are close. His mounts wear a red wrapper, many medicine belts around their lower chest, a red sword sling, and a wallet with two compartments to hold shaving and scarifying tools.
- Zainaba is married to Mai Gizo and is the step daughter of Sarkin Filani.

==== Totemism ====
As of the 1910s, totemism had limited importance and recognition. When it was recognized, each clan had a totem, regarded as sacred, which was connected to a patron bori. Both would be referred to as "kan gida" (head of the house). Children inherited the bori of their fathers, though they may also honor their mother's. Women kept their totems even after marriage, and husbands had the choice of if they would allow her to sacrifice near their home (which was more common) or if she needed to return to her father's home. One was free to marry someone with the same or different totem.

The totem tree (connected to either the bori or the totem animal) was never cut, and the totem animal was never eaten. The totem animal was only allowed to killed around harvest time by the chief men of the clan. They would smear the blood on their faces, particularly the forehead (associated with the bori). The head of the animal was sundried and put in the chief's home until it was replaced next year. The rest was buried. Everyone would bathe at least three days before, and was abstinent until a day or two after the ritual. Accidentally killing the totem at other times was not punished. Intentionally killing the totem would result in death, potentially caused by the totem's bori. Eating it, even accidentally, would cause illness. A bori ceremony may be held a few days after the ritual totem killing.

Incense may be used to summon totems, and different incenses are used for different animals. Most totem animals appear in bori dances.

==== Ceremonies ====
As of the 1910s in Tunis and Tripoli, there were bori houses (temples) with appointed priestesses, and a chief priest and priestess of West African origin. The priestess must be able to speak Hausa so she can direct performances, and she must be abstinent. She was usually a widow or divorced. The chief priest does not need to speak Hausa, and must be honest and of good judgement. Neither position is hereditary.

One may form a contract with a bori by sacrificing an animal associated with it. This is commonly done to remedy a misfortune or illness caused by the spirit, or to gain its favor and permission before undertaking certain actions. The spirit drinks the sacrificial blood and the meat is given by alms (sadaka) to Quran scholars and students, the homeless and destitute, or devotees and musicians. The recipient, upon being told what they're being given is alms, customarily says "May Allah grant your wish." The witness is a crucial part of the sacrifice, and has been emphasized so much that instead of being given raw meat as alms, one may also be given cooked meat or meatless food. In essence, alms for the bori now include grains and vegetables alongside meat.

Once one has human permission to build a house, they go to the building site and offer a sacrifice. This will always involve a white hen and a red rooster (only the bori Kuri and Mai-Inna accept these). If one can afford it, they also sacrifice a male goat, and if one is wealthy, they sacrifice a bull (all bori accept either). The blood is spilled on the ground for the bori. The future homeowner and friends eat the flesh. Another hen and rooster sacrifice is done when one moves in. The same is done when building a farm, though the goat is more optional. When moving into an already built house, one sacrifices a hen on the threshold. Similarly, when digging a well, a person would have a diviner go to the desired area, and they would use charms to point out a good dig site. The digger would sacrifice two foul and start digging.

In Nigeria, as part of the home building, one may set apart a building where incense offerings were done each Thursday, which summons the bori from anywhere in the world. Two fowl were sacrificed on anniversaries of the home building. By the 1910s, this practice had ceased among Nigerian Hausa Muslims, and was not relevant to Hausa Muslims in Tunis and Tripoli, as they were not allowed to build their own homes.

Grace is said before and after meals, but thanks is not given to the bori during this.

Different issues regarding bori may be resolved in different ways. For example, a bori may cause a false pregnancy where a woman gains weight for 9 or more months. This usually happens because a jealous woman or disappointed lover entreated a bori to do so, and can be hard to solve as bori lie about their identity to diviners, making it hard to know which is responsible. Another instance is if a woman struggles to conceive, she serks help from a boka or mallam. She burns incense for three days in a row, and breathes it in as she prays to God, Mohammed, Kuri, and other bori. This process may be intended to clear her of evil influence. An unwed girl's male bori may cause her period to stop suddenly to keep her from marrying and leaving him. When this happens, attempts are made to placate the bori in other ways.

A child who cries all the time is afflicted by a bori (usually Sa'idi) and the curative method is to hold the child over incense until it quiets. To protect a child from the Yayan Jiddari, ground nuts and sweets are placed by their head for three nights. After this, the treats are taken to a Mai-Bori, who places them in a pot for a few days. They will be eaten by the bori and vanish. If a childdoesnt develop properly, a Mai-Bori or Boka is consulted to find out the bori responsible, and the bori is sacrificed to. If a saint (marabout) is involved, the mother and other womem of the house may take the child to their tomb. There, they light a candle, burn incense, and rub the child with either the blood of a sacrificed white cock or with dirt from near the tomb. After this, another candle is lit and more incense is burnt. A gift is given to the tomb's caretaker as well.

The two types of rituals done by the Yan Bori are girka (the initiation ritual), and the periodic ceremonies. The latter is necessary after going through the former, but the Yan Bori do not penalize wayward members; scorning the bori, including by not going to periodic ceremonies, causes a resurgence in symptoms. The exception is wasam bori (play of the bori) a type of periodic ceremony that usually does not involve possession-trance.

Girka may be done in addition to herbal cures, functioning as a cure and as part of initiation into the bori possession-trance tradition. The word "girka" is related to the word for "boiling", and as such evokes both the idea of preparing traditional medicine and the heat felt in the bodies of mounts experiencing genuine trance. The girka ceremony involves the patient leaving their former residence, especially if it is with their relatives, for in-patient treatment. Generally, they do not return to live with their relatives after the ceremony is done. A "father" or "mother of girka" and their female assistant oversees all arrangements prior and during the girka, and the assistant acts as a nurse and cooks for the patient. An uwal saye may also be involved. Patients do not bring many personal items during treatment and only wear a body wrapper. Medicines start more broadly, in association with families of spirits known to cause certain problems, and become specific as the specific spirit(s) become known. Some medicines also protect the mounts from any strain they may experience while being ridden, as some spirits can be physically demanding. When musicians come during the girka process, the assistant prepares the patient by laying out a grass mat facing to Jangare and leads them around it. She then seats them, facing east, and places a special amulet in their hands and around their neck. She then ties their big toes and thumbs together and covers them in white cloth. She takes a seat to their right, facing north. This process signifies the submission of the mount to the spirits and sets them at ease. For 6–13 days, musicians will play 3 times a day for the patient, starting with Sarkin Makada and ending with Nakada. The first three days are dedicated to the songs for the pagan "black" spirits. During this, a wand made from Calotropis procera may be used to coax the spirits to dismount by pointing them away from the patient's head. Through this process the spirits on their head are made peace with, and the patient gains skill in behaving as a mount.

An uwal saye (trainer) will know herbal spirit medicine, and cure the patient who has been diagnosed with a spirit causing their affliction accordingly. The uwal saye trains the new people in the dress, behavior, and personality of the spirits; knowledge of the spirit world (Jangare, the city of spirits); and what illness they cause. This training is mostly kept secret. Acting as a mount is considered a learned skill. The final stage of the cure is acting in a dance as mount during the kwanan zauen (the night spent sitting up), also called wasa na hira (entertainment for chatting). This is a ceremony where the patient is presented as a "horse of the gods", and they are publicly ridden for the first time and recognized as a mount. This takes place on the 7th day, if the former stage only took the usual 6 days. Experienced mounts who share the spirit dance alongside the new one, showing them the finer points of the performance. After this, the new mount bathes, gives gifts to the assistant that helped, and sponsors a sacrifice to their primary spirit. The items used during initiation are gifted by the new mount to the assistant as well, as they are polluted and unfit for use by the mount. This establishes relations with the spirit, and is considered self administered. This creates a lifelong relationship of mutual benefit; the patient is healed and can help others as a medium, and the spirit can express itself in performances. Possession-trance is important as a cure, since it is thought that if the bori are the origin of a malady, they must also be the origin of its cure. Part of this type of cure is acceptance by the patient to be involved in the possession-trance group, and belief in its practices. This is the primary form of initiation, and after this, the new devotee can treat others with similar spirit afflictions. Possession is viewed negatively, as the possessed no longer behaves normally. However, initiation into the Yan Bori turns possession into a more positive state. In instances where it is deemed impossible to cure someone, the individual is still encouraged to participate in Yan Bori events, and will be supported by the group.

It is generally inappropriate for a musician to be an active Yan Bori member. As such a musician who has taken up the nanyle of boka cannot instruct his patients in trance as he has likely not done it, and it would be improper for him to do so. Curing rituals organized by musicians as such mostly focus on curing the patient, and it is thought that musicians will be able to keep the spirit dormant via recognition of their power and regular sacrifices. As such, the patient will not need to trance. The Yan Bori regard these cures as incomplete or worse, but outsiders view them as an effective alternative to full initiation. The patient is still considered a "horse of the gods", but is not expected to trance. Instead they give gifts to other mounts when they trance.

When organizing an event, the host gives a gift to a Yan Bori member or musician they have an affinity with, who shares this gift with musicians and trancers. By taking a share in this gift, one is obligated to participate in the ceremony. This gift may consist of kola nuts, candy, or money. Occasionally a participant will accept the invitation without gift if the intermediary or the host has a relationship with them, and may use this as a future bit of leverage or to satisfy a standing social debt. Another gift is usually given to the musicians by the host upon arrival to further coax them to set up to perform. This may also be replaced by an obligation, as with the invitation gift.

Attendants to bori dances dress in their best things. During these ceremonies, songs and praise-epithets are sung to and about the spirits by maroka (musicians). These are not always the same songs and praise-epithets, and may vary in the same performance. This variation helps create a full picture of the spirit. The vocal music honors and calls the spirits, while the instrumental music induces trance and controls the flow of time at the ceremony. The first song played at bori ceremonies, both in urban and in many rural areas, is one praising Allah.

The ideal maroka speaks clearly, enunciates well, and knows many stories and praise-epithets about spirits (sometimes knowing these about almost 300 different spirits). The spirits can't be called without their music. The maroka are professional musicians, and typically are not themselves possessed. Their music groups usually consist of a leader, chorus, praise-shouter, and an optional vocalist. All the maroka sit, except for the praise-shouter, who walks in front of them, praising the spirits and announcing gifts. When an audience member or participant wishes to address the gathering, they take the praise-shouter to the side. The praise-shouter shouts the proceedings to a halt and says the praises and genealogy of the speaker, who he calls mai magana (owner of speech). They tell the praise-shouter their message quietly and he shouts it out. He is paid 1/10 of a naira for this as of the 1970s.

The maroka's music induces trance in the "mounts" (performing possessed) with a gradually increasing tempo, and then the spirits are called down. The mounts sit before the musicians, sometimes covered with a cloth, and move in intensity with the music. They have entered trance when they collapse or begin moving as the spirit. The mounts consciously try to disconnect and provide themselves as a vessel for the spirits. Auditory and visual intensity are used to induce trance, and this technique is also found in Hamadsha rituals. At events where different pieces of music are played for different spirits, mounts often prepare to be mounted by multiple spirits; at events a spirit only takes one mount at a time, and it is possible for a mount to be mounted, take a break, and return to be mounted again. If a spirit wishes to leave a performance, it will thank the musicians and have its mount sit down. The musicians play a short piece for it, and the spirit dismounts (often signaled by the mount sneezing).

The dancer who is possessed ("ridden") is called a horse. During possession, only the spirit speaks, and the human is not held responsible for what occurs during possession-trance. Possession-trance is characterized by the mounts acting out the speech and behavior of specific spirits. The Yan Bori recognize that possession-trances may be authentic or fraudulent, with the latter being a result of an inept mount. Relatedly, because proper possession-trance is a learned skill, it is expected that new devotees will be less proficient and spectacular. True trance is marked by intense sweating and high body temperature. Amnesia regarding what occurred during trance is common. When one wants a bori to enter, such as at this time, one does not say "thanks be to God". Two mounts of the same spirit may have it manifest differently.

Events without trance and with simultaneously induced trance from one song are structurally similar. The main difference is in the latter case the host must present a gift of kola nuts, candy, and cash and ask the musicians to begin. The mounts come over, and if they accept a portion of the gift, they will trance.

Most women in the possession-trance group do not attend the public ceremonies, instead going to secluded, private ceremonies overseen by other women. The music there is performed by women on a kwarya.

Bori cures provide safety and support for marginalized Hausa, as well as entertainment in the form of dances. These ceremonies may be considered theater, sacred, or both by outsiders. Many first become involved with bori ceremonies and groups because of illnesses that could not be cured. Bori dance ceremonies may be done as often as once a week to maintain health and the relationship between human and spirit. These periodic performances promote solidarity among the possession-trance group, reaffirm their obligations, and separate and bond together different groups affiliated with the possession-trance rites. They are frequent during the first half of the dry season and gradually drop in frequency in anticipation of the rainy season, where few ceremonies and initiations are done. Performances pick up again after the harvest. Performances are not done during Ramadan.

The Yan Dandu often hang around the brothels associated with the possession-trance group for social and economic reasons, and attend the public dance ceremonies. They may dance at these themselves, though they typically do not trance. They give small gifts of money to trancing mounts, especially if Dan Galadima is present.

One of the ceremonies a Magajiyar Bori may preside over is one where she invites others to her compound to witness her be ridden by as many of her spirits as possible, ideally all of them. She is the only active medium here (though accidental trances may occur from others). Each spirit is greeted on arrival, and wished well on its journey out. The spirits may give gifts of kola nuts, sweets, vegetables, perfume, and money. The audience may also give money by pressing it to the forehead of the Magajiyar Bori and ketting it fall to the ground. Guests also give the musicians in attendance money.

Different rituals associated with the Yan Bori may be classified by the instruments used, wfich devotees themselves do to some extent. These distinct ways of calling a spirit would be kidan kwarya (drumming on calabashes), kidan garaya (strumming a two stringed lute), kidan goge (bowing a one stringed lute), and busan sarewa (blowing a whistle). They may also be classified by venue and participants. The kidan amada has songs played on kwarya by non-professional female musicians. They are usually secluded, held inside a compound, and largely attended by women. Kidan bori can refer to any ritual or ceremony where bori are called, but usually refers to public performances with mixed gender audiences where the garaya, goge, and sarewa are played by professional male musicians. These events have different protocol for gift giving. Small amounts of money given to mounts are done at both without formality.

The act of gift giving, which is one of the more obvious displays of generosity in Hausa culture, has added significance in accordance with the giver and receiver's respective positions in the social hierarchy when done publicly. In the context of the Yan Bori, the gift implies separateness between the giver and receiver, its content is determined by the givers position in relation to the possession-trance group and broader Hausa society, and underlines the ties between separate and unequal social levels as the gift cannot be directly repaid in kind. This is because exchanges between equals do not often occur at ceremonies (the exception being spirits giving each other ritual objects their attendants have to retrieve at the end). The repayment for gifts of money is via services, such as participation in the possession-trance group and witnessing a ceremony. Repayment, especially between those who are not equals, comes in a form different from the original gift. Money begets services, and sacrifices beget divine favor.

While the mount embodies a spirit, those not experiencing trance have the opportunity to give the spirit gifts. For some, such as other mounts of the same spirit, this may be more of an obligation. Not doing so may anger the spirit and cause their ailment to reoccur. For others, they may do this to get answers for questions. Most gifts are money, and most gifts end up as property of the mount. Large gifts given at public rituals must be announced by a praise shouter. A stop is called for, where the mounts in trance stand "at ease" and the musicians stop playing. The name of the gift giver, their genealogy, and praise-epithets are said. Them the gifts are described in a way that's accurate, but that inflates their important and quantity. For this service the praise-shouter is given a smaller additional gift of money.

Gifts to those not directly involved in a performance can done discreetly, but those for spirits, mounts, or performing musicians should be brought forward and displayed at the feet of the seated musicians. Different shoes and hats are done for each recipient to make distribution easier. All gifts given to dancers that don't trance are given by them to the musicians.

Usually all gifts to the maroka are pooled and divided up according to rank, but if one favors a particular musician, they can catch their eye and say something indicating they should step to the side, where the secret gift is given. If spotted by a praise shouter, the gift will be made public knowledge. When the event ends, participants gather around the musicians for the first distribution. The musicians share is not counted yet, but each praise shouter takes a small amount from it. The leader of the musicians then counts the money and itemizes the other gifts given to the mounts, announcing the amount each spirit was given. The mount comes forward and collects it, giving one third of it to the musicians as a thank you, and another third to their attendant or other assistant.

Black male goats were at one point preferred sacrifices. However, chickens, guinea fowl, and pigeons were also used, though turkey and ducks were not. Sacrificial animals are selected based on breed, color, sex, and so on, in order to correspond to the appropriate spirit.

==== Music ====
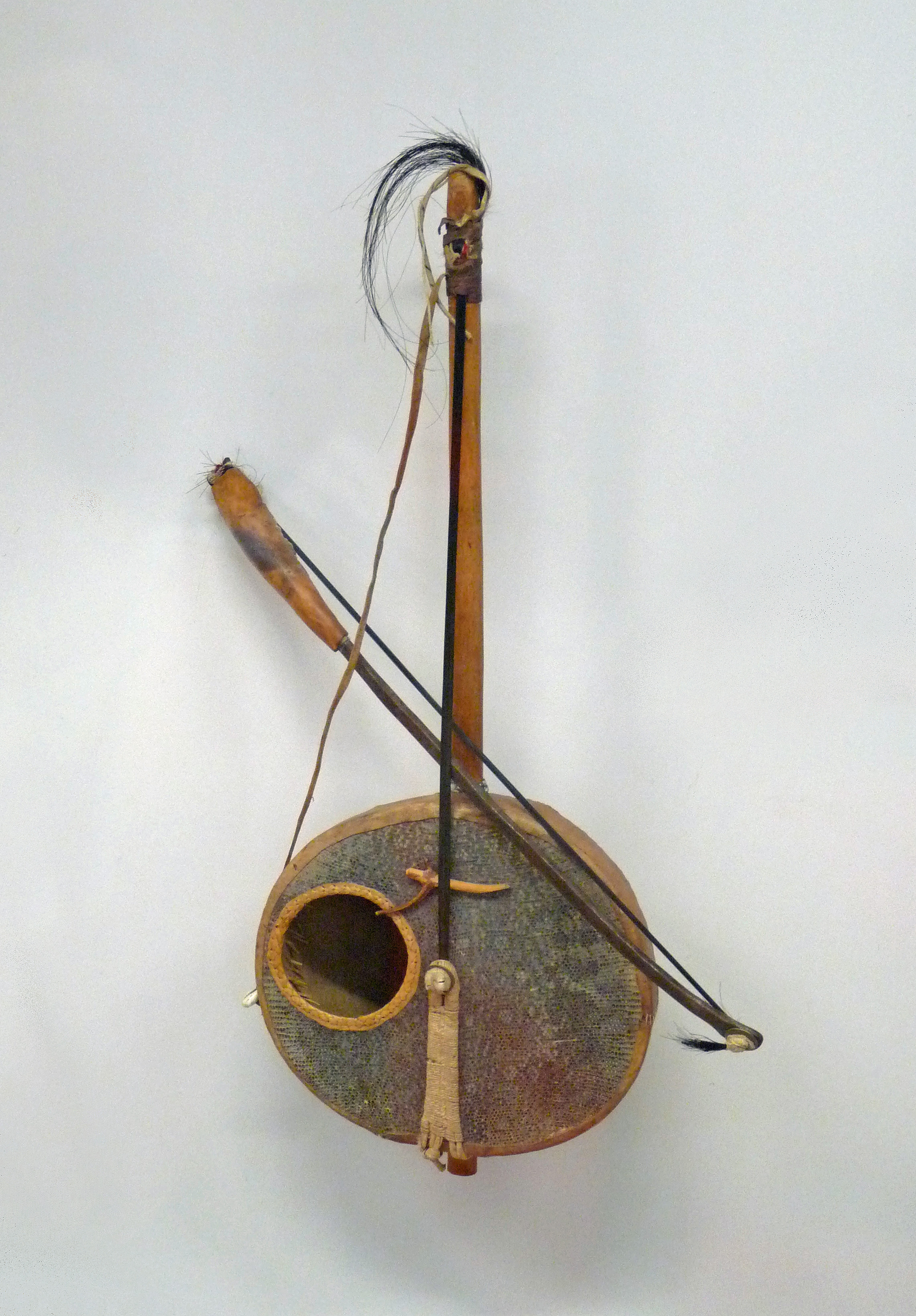
Goje or goge, an African fiddle. This one was collected from the Hausa people for a museum

Most Yan Bori affiliated musicians do not receive formal training, learning via demonstration, observation, and correction. A musician may either learn from older kin or someone they are not related to at all as an apprentice. Both are equally common among the general population of Hausa maroka, but the former is more common for Yan Bori affiliated musicians. For them, these are also usually not lineal relatives such as their father or grandfather. Apprenticeships occur when there is an available skilled musician affiliated with the Yan Bori, and when the prospective musician lacks relatives that can or will teach them. The master of an apprentice takes social and professional responsibility for them.

Initial training starts at 8 or 9 and mainly occurs through private practice and observing performances. Around 13–14, one graduates from a child's rattle to a big one, and becomes a full member of the group. Yan Bori musicians copy and preserve the music they are taught as closely as possible and are typically not creative artists. Further training is done by oneself, often by moving to a less densely populated, non-judgemental area. If one moves back home after that, they are careful not to compete with their master. The reason this training is done by oneself is because the master musician typically regards further training as a threat to his position in the group and his finances.

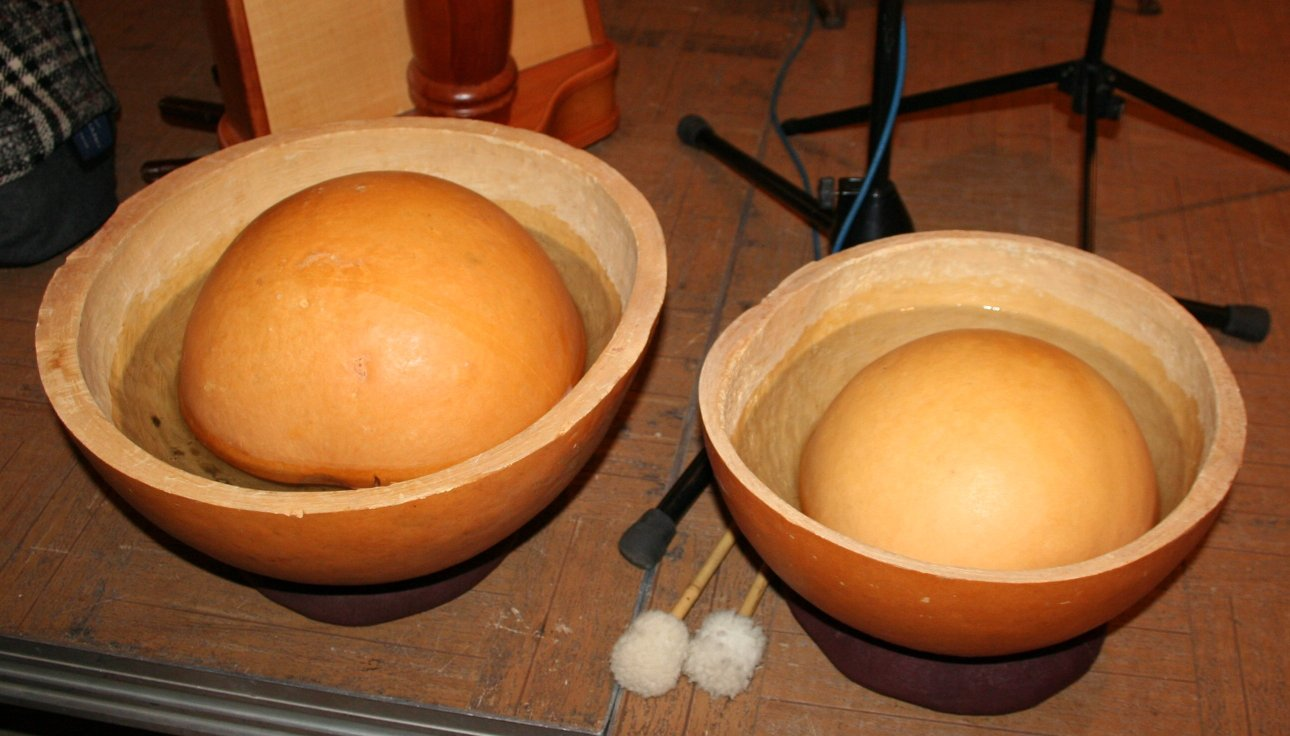
Water drum (tulluwa in Hausa).

Instruments played by men are not played by women and vice versa. Women who play at bori events may or may not be professionals, but men always are. Women play the kwaryar kidan ruwa (water drum calabash). Men play the garaya, buta (bottle-shaped gourd rattle), goge (fiddle), kwarya (calabash basin), and sarewa (cornstalk or bamboo flute). Male musicians group the garaya and buta rattles together in one ensemble, and the goge and kwarya in another. Sarewa were uncommon in the 1970s, but on occasion took the place of a goge accompaniment to the kwarya. The musical styles of the two different instrumental ensembles found among men are quite different from each other, and it is considered inappropriate for musicians of one group to play the music of another.

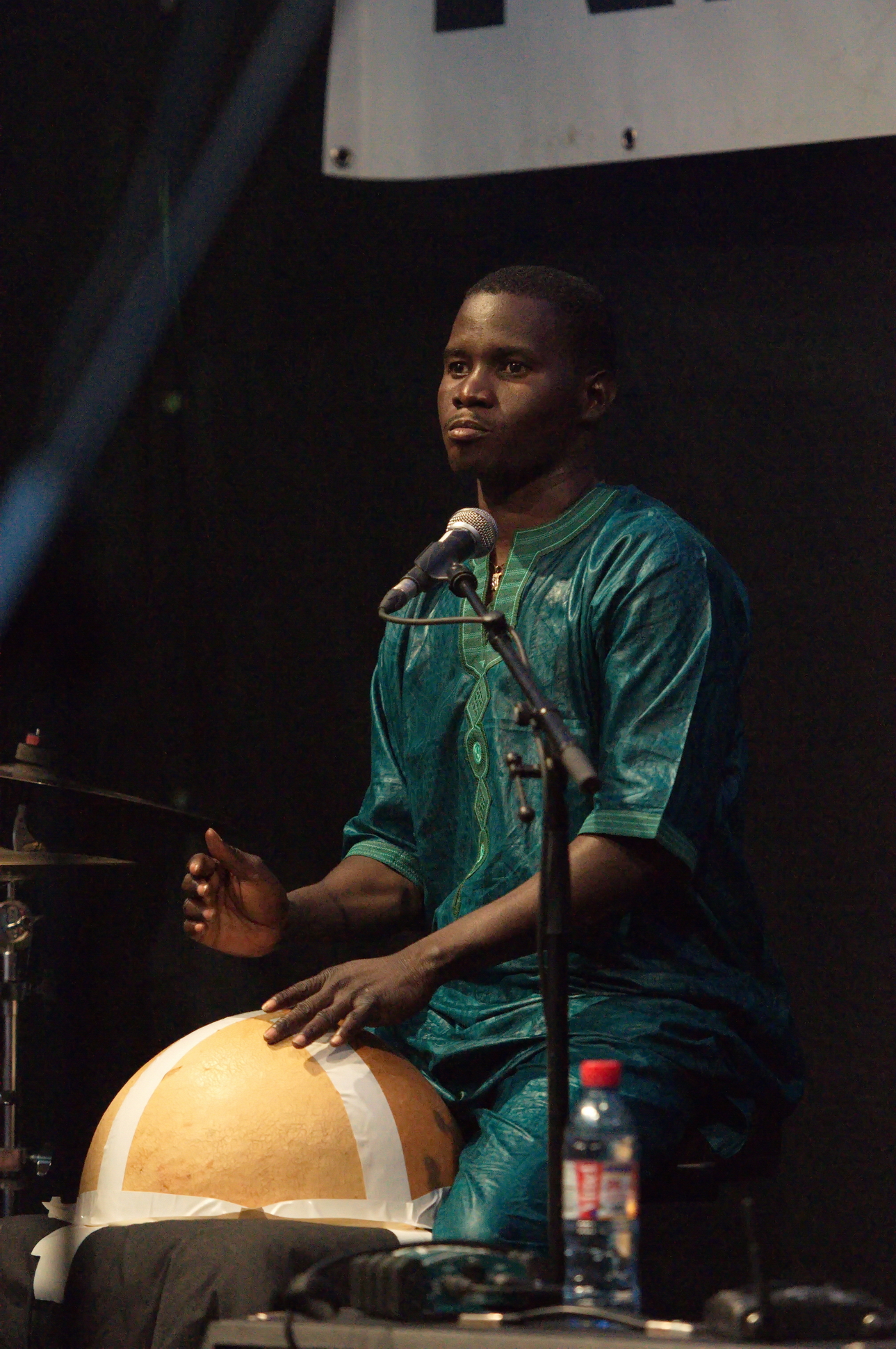
Musician playing a large calabash.

The kwaryar kidan ruwa consist of a few instruments. The one that often takes the role as lead instrument is the masakin kadawa, aka the ganga, a large half calabash played with the hands, typically by a female professional musician. The common second is the tulluwa, a small calabash that is inverted and floated in a larger calabash filled with water and beaten with a stick. It is typically played by non-professional female musicians. Usually only these two are used, but kazagin amada (kazagi for amada) may be used for the chorus and played by non-professional female musicians. It is a small hemispherical calabash inverted on the ground and played with two sticks. Two to four kazagi will be used at a time.

There are two types of garaya, small and big. The big garaya has a 15 inch long exposed neck and a 20 inch long body, with an overall length of 35 inches. The neck ends in a two pronged fork inside the body, and the body is covered in skin from a gada (Crested Duiker). The wood parts are usually from the aliliba tree (Cordia abyssinica), and the gourd body is usually a zumbulutu or duma. The strings are artificial cat gut and pass over a compound bridge called a jaki (donkey), then tie to the forked end of the neck. A hole in the top of the skin at the garaya's lower end is strengthened by red goatskin. It allows for the knots holding the string to be checked. The left hand holds the neck and stops the strings, the right hand plucks. The instrument itself sits in the lap, partially supported by its carrying strap. The small garaya is played with a cowhide plectrum, and the big one is played by two cowrie shells strung end to end. The garaya were originally associated with hunters. It is unknown when or why they became associated with the bori. The gimbri, a similar instrument used for bori in 1914 Tunis and Tripoli, may be a related instrument.

Buta rattles range from 10 to 15 inches long and are bottle shaped. The average size is 13 inches with a circumference of 24 inches. They are made from emptied out common gourds, filled with small stones or corn seeds. If right handed, a player ties 2-5 pairs of cowrie shells to the middle joints of their left hand. It is played by shaking with a roll, back and forth, or by being beaten with the left hand. Particular combinations of these movements are associated with different spirits and different garaya melodies. Some feel that different buta rattles should be used for different spirits, as the number of stones or particles is said to be 99, each one representing each spirit that can be called by it. There are hundreds of spirits, so one rattle, under this understanding, is not sufficient for all performances.

The goge has a piercing sound. It is 26 inches long in total, with the neck and vibrating strings being 15 inches long. The body is called a kumbo, and is hemispherical and made from half a gourd that's been cut latitudinally. The skin (fata) is made from a Nile monitor (guza). The string is secured to the neck by leather cords (kallabi). The string (tsagiya) is made from a horse's tail hairs. It has a bridge made from a three-pronged twig of the urkure tree, and a piece called the kahom butsiya, a small horn-like wedge inserted between the lower end of the string and the skin to increase string tension. Small stones or cowrie shells may be put under the skin to make it tighter. The bow may be called izga, yazga, or tambara, and is made of iron or bronze and horse tail hairs. Potash and resin from the Copaiba balsam tree (Pardaniellia Oliveri) are used on the body and bow strings as needed. The player stops the string and holds the goge in his left hand and bows with his right hand. The instrument rests in the lap. The music of the goge at bori events often directly translates into speech, with trancing mounts having conversations with a goge. Audience members can typically understand what the goge is "saying" as well. The goge likely descends from the Maghrebi ghugha.

The kwaryar goge is similar to the masakin kadawa, but it placed on the ground without a blanket underneath to muffle it. It is beaten with two sticks and sits between the player's legs. A skilled musician will use their heel to lift it off the ground and produce "open" and "closed" sounds.

Instruments have a carrying strap, maratayi, that also supports instruments while they're being played. The strap may be cloth or goatskin. All instruments are decorated to he unique, and the strap may be decorated as well. Most musicians own their own instruments, and music leaders often keep spare cowrie shells, sticks, and gourds. However, hostesses of amada events often have a personal set of gourds they will give the musicians to use.

Excellence, overall, occurs at least occasionally in every musician's career. The greatest musicians simply have excellent moments at a higher frequency. Creative musicians are more likely to be singers than instrumentalists. A good singer has a clear voice, repeats information often enough for the audience to understand, but not too often, as this gives the impression that he is repeating phrases to give himself time to think of a new one. They work information into the expected and appropriate bounds of song. Singers who perform while not also playing an instrument are held to higher standards. Possession is seen as induced primarily through instrumental music and not vocal. An excellent instrumental musician can quickly induce trance as well as being a skilled improviser. The best musician in a group is usually the leader, most commonly playing the lute.

The two kinds of music at bori performances are vocal-instrumental and only instrumental. Vocal music consists of praise-epithets (which are fairly static), stories about a spirit (these are variable, but they tend to be short), and invitations for them to possess a particular devotee (which vary based on the singer's style and the pace of the instrumental). Instrumental pieces (cashiya) are typically faster in tempo and are meant for dancing or inducing trance.

Songs generally stay the same to preserve the meaning and significance of them. However, personal flourishes added to songs are perfectly acceptable, and being able to do such flourishes well is a mark of excellence.

==== Leadership and other roles ====
The principal leader of Bori possession-trance groups in a region is the Sarkin Bori (chief of the Bori). This role is usually filled by a man. He is nominally the authority over all other Bori mediums in a region, and hosts any mediums traveling through an area. He organizes performances, sending gifts and invites to the performers. He is given a portion of the performance proceeds, and may be responsible for distributing them. This role is chosen by the possession-trance group based on an individual's experience as a medium and their popularity, and confirmed via the turbaning ceremony used for political offices in general Hausa society. The actual power and role of the Sarkin Bori varies regionally. The Sarkin Bori and other male leaders are in charge of public possession-trance ceremonies.

The Magajiyar Bori (heiress of the Bori) is always a woman. Technically the position is subordinate to the Sarkin, but individual Magajiyar Bori may have equal or greater renown. Some may oversee districts as large as the district the Sarkim Bori, but most oversee smaller districts. She may also be the head of a brothel, and her district may be the area surrounding it. The Magajiyar Bori and female leaders in charge of secluded ceremonies. Because of the public/private distinction, while many think of possession-trance groups as having a single vertical hierarchy, it is more accurate to describe them as parallel.

The possession-trance group may borrow titles associated with the emirate structure to describe itself. These titles are used because they are a familiar system for organizing.

The musicians (maroka) preserve the group's oral tradition, and are thought of as mediators between the mounts and their spirits. Some musicians also are boka, or are astrologers who do horoscopes. Semi urban musicians all tend to divide their time between music and another occupation, such as farming, though they will primarily be seen as maroka. Yan Bori musicians may double as boka, diviners (which in practice may amount to being a counselor), and sellers of Bori paraphernalia. In order to be a boka, one must also be a Yan Bori initiate. Normally, the Sarkin Bori is consulted as a boka, so musicians only fill this role when local leadership is weak or nonexistent. Being a diviner does not conflict with Bori beliefs, which focus on the past and present. Divining is not particularly connected to Bori beliefs, and as such it can be easier for Muslim Hausa to admit to believing in astrology than the Bori. Both Maguzawa and Hausa Muslims primarily employ musicians for spiritual purposes at possession-trance ceremonies. In the Hausa social structure, which is primarily based on occupation for men, musicians, praise singers, and praise shouters are that bottom, and at the bottom of them are the possession-trance musicians. Others affiliated with the group are not ranked by their group affiliation.

Musician groups internally rank themselves, either with titles or more casually. The first is less common. One such example of titles being used had the leader of a female musician group be turbaned with the title Sarkin kidan Kwarye (Chief of beating the kwarya). Her assistants were Majidadin Kwarya (Majidadi of Kwarya) and Wazirin Kwarya (Waziri of Kwarya). As with non-musical Yan Bori positions, music groups elect leaders for the title. It could be that formal titles are mostly used by musicians associated with royal courts, which is not the case for most musicians associated with the Yan Bori. It is more common for the leader of a musician group to be called by his personal name or nickname, and the instrument he plays- such as "(Name) Mai Garaya", meaning "(Name) who plays the garaya". The leader manages the musicians, and the event host may only deal with the leader. If the Yan Bori leaders in a region are weak or absent, it may the responsibility of the leading musician that does Yan Bori performances to invite the mounts to perform at events. This especially the case for performances at weddings and namings.

The music leader is expected to be generous with dividing the money earned at performances. They must choose carefully not to performances with small or stingy crowds, and ideally should take pay cuts to prevent friction in the group if the earrings were small. A normal way of dividing performance money would be 50% for the leader, and the remaining 50% divided evenly among the other musicians. Apprentices occasionally appear in music groups, and receive smaller shares of money.

Prospective musicians are mainly the sons or nephews of musicians (through maternal uncles), with the former being more common. In the latter case, having maternal relatives that are musicians is not the primary reason one becomes a musician, and more so is a justification as most Hausa don't think anyone would choose to be a musician. Further, musicians affiliated with the Yan Bori usually have family members who were, or are themselves initiates. The latter is less common, as it is not seen as socially acceptable for a musician to trance or do other things typical of a Yan Bori. Being a musician is a potential alternative to being a trancer, though it is not commonly taken.

Being a Yan Bori musician is about more than being able to play certain instrument or tune. They believe in the power of their music and the spirits. The latter puts them in conflict with mainstream Muslim beliefs (though many Hausa privately believe in the Bori). This conflict and stereotypes about them make the maroka sensitive about their public perception. Learning about the Bori starts young. Urban Yan Bori musicians often live in compounds with the Yan Bori and their sympathizers or nearby. Both groups are usually poor and ostracized for their beliefs, and are as such drawn together. Collectively they teach their children about the Bori and to respect them, often at evening gossip sessions in or near compounds.

In addition to music and information about the Bori, young musicians are taught acceptable behavior in broader society, being more deferential and using more flattery due to their status. Other Hausa see this as insincere, but musicians that don't behave accordingly are criticized. Yan Bori musicians have more deviants than musicians in general, and behave accordingly. For example, it is proper to visit Bori patrons, but if one's finances aren't in chaos, a Yan Bori musician will stay home instead of making an expected visit to emphasize their independence. The Yan Bori musicians are confident that the patron will call upon them and the Yan Bori regardless once the spirit bothers them again.

Women and men in the Yan Bori keep somewhat separate. Many are also unmarried, and therefore don't live with spouses. Instead they live with each other in compounds under the leadership of a senior, who may also be a devotee. These compounds may also function as brothels. The higher status a leader has, the more people usually live with them in a compound. Superiors in Hausa society give money and material gifts to inferiors who repays with services, with exception of a compound leader collecting rent from inferior devotees in their compound. These compounds are centers for Yan Bori activity and places for mediums to socialize. Even devotees who live alone or with family visit the compound after the evening meal.

Those with spirits of the same generation and house are considered equals. Gifts between equals among the Yan Bori are repaid in kind; money for money, food for food, cloth for cloth. Gifts between devotees of the same sex are more common than cross sex gifts. New devotees are typically the mounts of lower ranked, junior spirits. Senior devotees are typically ridden by spirits of the senior generation, house leaders, or Sarkin Aljan. The Yan Bori are expected to own objects to demonstrate possession-trance for each spirit on their heads, but only have complete costumes for a few. The materials are expensive, and most spirits only get a few damaru (medicine belts), a zane (body cloth), and a few other items. Items can be borrowed from seniors, but it is considered better to own them. Usually the makers and more common sellers of such items are initiates, and this is true of the musicians that sell them.

Achievements within the Yan Bori do not increase one's general social status, but do increase their ritual status. While broader Hausa society may often primarily select leaders based on status, genealogy, and the personal reasons of an emir, all Yan Bori leaders and the leaders of the closely associated music groups are selected based on their achievements and skill. High cult status is marked by the ability to give, and doing so validates one's status in the eyes of others. The seniority of a Yan Bori member is based on their ability to act convincingly and skillfully as a mount. Sex, age, time since initiation, and wealth do not matter in this respect. As one gains seniority one is called to publicly act as mount for the more important, senior spirits on their head. It is unusual for any new initiate to start with the more important spirits. One must prove and hone their skill first.

Devotees whose spirits "travel together" often become friends.

== Demographics and perception ==
Most of the adherents to the bori possession-trance group are women, who are stereotyped as single and as prostitutes. Male homosexuals, transvestites, transgender women, those with psychological disturbances, and men of low occupational status also are involved in the group. It is officially condemned by Muslim Hausa religious authorities, but the general opinion among Muslim Hausa is more varied- the group and rituals may be thought of as colorful, dramatic, entertaining, dangerous, frightening, or even disgusting. It is popularly thought to be an effective cure.

The distinction between adult and child is very important in the Hausa social hierarchy. One becomes an adult after getting married. Those who are single past the right age are called karuwai, and are considered social deviants. They may be ostracized and harassed, and the Yan Bori are stereotyped as being karuwai.

Devotees are also stereotyped as behaving unusually, being wild eyed, personally unclean, religiously ambivalent, and generally odd. Devotees capitalize on this when advantageous, but often dispute this by dressing conservatively and acting as normal as possible. Many devotees have family members from previous generations who were involved in the possession-trance group, and those who do are more common than those who don't. They may inherit one or more spirits from a relative (this is often patrilineal, but women may inherit spirits from female kin).

The Yan Bori and their associates are viewed with suspicion by broader Muslim society. They consider themselves Muslims and hold to the Five Pillars of Faith, and do not see this as conflicting with their belief in the bori. They are often scapegoated during times of drought and other strife, and will keep a low profile during those times. At such times they recognize that Allah is the ultimate cause of the drought, but Sarkin Rafi is the one acting it out, and therefore the one to sacrifice to. Cult activity often lessens during Ramadan and before the rainy season as these are times of unsafe public opinion.

Mediums in the Yan Bori don't fit neatly into the occupation based hierarchy of Hausa society, as being a medium isn't considered a craft. Musicians associated with the group (who are low in the occupational hierarchy) may be thought of as extortionists, as they receive gifts at ceremonies, and are stereotyped as lazy, dirty spendthrifts. In general, many devotees are treated as second class citizens prior to their involvement with the Yan Bori. In light of this, the group can function as a place where even though they are still separate from society (and where they even emphasize their separation), they have a group to which they belong where they are protected.

In the Hausa social strata, the work of musicians is classified as roko (begging). The key aspect that defines roko is that the service done is acclamation and the socioeconomic circumstances around it, with the use of music to do this being irrelevant. For example, Tambari drum players are not considered maroka, and have a higher rank as royal slaves. They spend most of the year doing farm work. Professional maroka affiliated with the Yan Bori may achieve fame and recognition for their excellence, but this is uncommon. Non-musicians generally refuse to eat from the same bowl or live in the same building as the maroka. Yan Bori musicians in turn are regarded similarly by other musicians, and either live by themselves as compound owners, or more commonly as tenants with other tenants. They are not so maligned as to be endogamous. They marry the children of other musicians and non-musicians, especially farmers and blacksmiths.

Other parts of the scorn musicians face is that instruments are not normally played in mosques, and many Muslim scholars and leaders think kinds of Hausa music are evil, such as music involving the goge. The goge is one of the main instruments used for summoning the bori, which they view as devils. Their association with the Yan Bori furthers this. Additionally, the maroka consist of men and women, while many Hausa occupations only consist of one or the other. Ensembles may be mixed, led by women, entirely women, or entirely men. Non-professional musicians also exist, and are socially ranked by their primary occupation.

Musicians in general are very visible due to their behavior, dress, and carrying instruments. Yan Bori musicians tend to put their instruments in cloth bags when not performing, and usually are not given and cannot afford the elaborate gowns other musicians may wear. This makes them inconspicuous and less likely to be harassed or criticized in public for their Yan Bori affiliation.

Boka services have competition in urban areas from malams (Quran scholars) and astrologers who do horoscopes. In urban areas, non-bori cures, such as hospitals and malams, are sought out before turning to the Yan Bori or its affiliates.
