= Isaac Fletcher =

Isaac Fletcher may refer to:

- Isaac Fletcher (American politician) (1784–1842), American lawyer and politician
- Isaac Fletcher (British politician) (1827–1879), British ironmaster and politician
- Isaac Fletcher (footballer) (born 2002), English footballer
- Isaac Dudley Fletcher (1844–1917), American businessman, art collector and museum benefactor

== See also ==
- Isaac Fletcher Redfield (1804–1876), American lawyer, judge, and legal scholar
