= Yulia Tolopa =

Russian-born female Ukrainian volunteer fighter

- Юлия Толопа
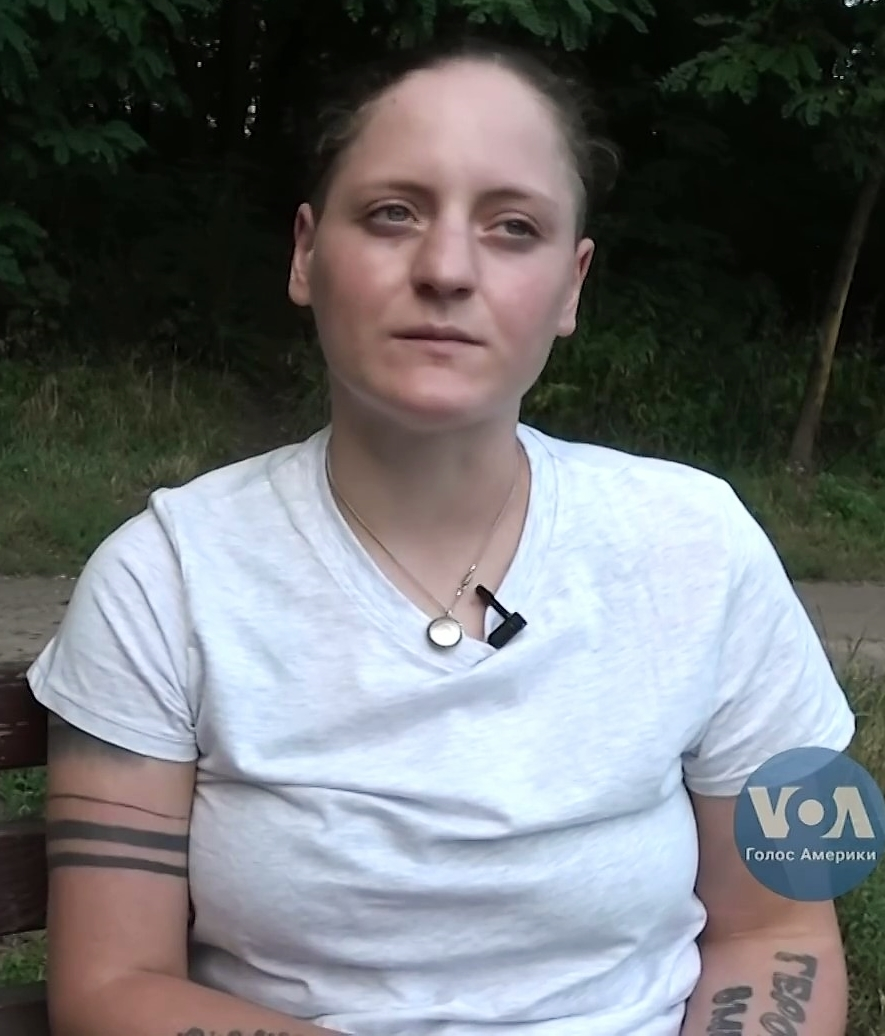
- Tolopa interviewed by Voice of America in 2021
- Born: 1995 or 1996 (age 30–31); Podkumok, Stavropol Krai, Russia
- Children: 1
- Military career
- Allegiance: Ukraine
- Branch: Ukrainian volunteer battalions; Ukrainian Ground Forces
- Service years: 2014–2019
- Nickname: Valkyrie
- Units: Aidar Battalion; Donbas Battalion; 58th Independent Motorized Infantry Brigade
- Known for: Russian female volunteer fighting for Ukraine

Yulia Tolopa (call sign "Valkyrie"), (Russian: Юлия Толопа, "Валькирия"; Ukrainian: Юлія Толопа, "Валькірія"; born 1995) is a Russian-born female volunteer who fought for Ukraine in the Russo-Ukrainian War.

Tolopa grew up as a Russian nationalist and Cossack and at the age of eighteen became a Russian Federation champion of hand to hand combat. She went to Kyiv to see the 2014 Ukrainian revolution firsthand. Joining the Ukrainian volunteer Aidar Battalion, she fought against some of her former friends. Her family and Russian media declared her a traitor, and the Russian government threatened her with imprisonment. After a year she left the military to give birth to a daughter. Afterward, she returned to fighting, first with the Donbas Battalion, then with the 16th battalion of the 58th Independent Motorized Infantry Brigade of the Ukraine regular army, when women were officially allowed to take part in combat.

Ukraine delayed giving her Ukrainian nationality for years. This made her fear deportation back to Russia. She finally received Ukrainian nationality in 2021. In the 2022 Russian invasion of Ukraine, Tolopa sheltered in western Ukraine with her daughter.

== Early life ==
Yulia Tolopa was born in 1995 or 1996 (age 30–31) and raised in Podkumok, Stavropol Krai, a rural settlement near Pyatigorsk, in southern Russia just north of the Caucasus. Her paternal grandfather and great-grandfather were Ukrainian, from Zaporizhzhia. She and her three brothers had a difficult family life. Tolopa stopped living with her mother at the age of 14 and her father died in 2013, when she was 18.

Tolopa spent her childhood with Russian nationalists, who taught her how to fight. She learned to shoot guns and trained at the military sports club "Yermak", learning mixed martial arts and cage fighting. She joined the modern Don Cossack forces of "Ataman" Nikolai Kozitsyn, that would later take an active role against Ukraine. At the age of 18, she became a Russian Federation champion of hand to hand combat (Russian: штурмовому рукопашному бою). She studied in Kislovodsk Medical College for two years, but never completed her medical education.

== Fighting for Ukraine ==
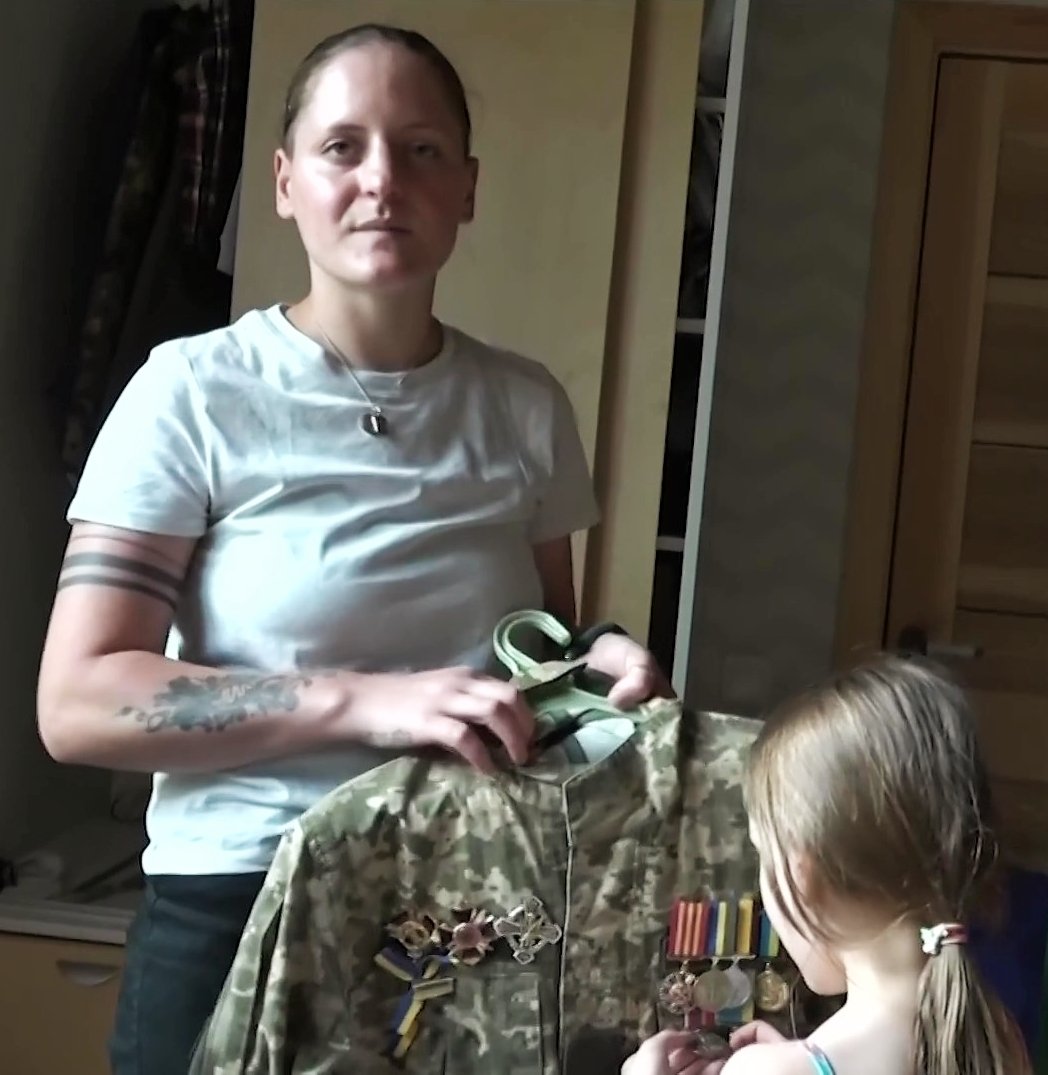
Tolopa with uniform and daughter, 2021

Her nationalist mentors had raised Tolopa to believe that Ukrainians and Belarusians were her Slavic brothers, and initially they supported the EuroMaidan. Tolopa defended her hand to hand combat title on 29 March 2014 and then on 2 April, she took a train to Kyiv to offer help, or just see the Maidan for herself. Once there, she befriended Ukrainians, and joined their side. First she participated in the remaining EuroMaidan encampment, then when Russian troops entered Sloviansk she volunteered to fight against the Russians.

=== Aidar Battalion ===
Tolopa's nationalist friends turned against Ukraine during the 2014 Ukrainian revolution and the war in Donbas, but in June 2014, at the age of eighteen, Tolopa joined the recently formed Aidar Battalion, and went to fight in the Donbas. Tolopa said she fought for Ukraine for an ideal, while her former friends were paid to fight against Ukraine. Her military call sign, "Valkyrie", was a name she already had from Russia, given in a pagan temple of the Slavic Native Faith. In June the LNR People's Militia were distributing a wanted poster of Tolopa, warning she was a killer-sniper from Lipetsk. Tolopa denied being a sniper, saying she was a rifleman and from July served as the commander of a captured BMP-2, an infantry fighting vehicle. She was officially listed as a radiotelephone operator; until 2016, women were not formally allowed to serve in Ukrainian forces in combat positions.

At least once, at Lutuhyne, Tolopa fought against the Don Cossack troops which she had formerly been part of. She was wounded twice and suffered concussions seven times. On 12 July 2014, she suffered a heavy concussion and three broken ribs, when the civilian car she was in hit a land mine. The driver and another passenger were killed immediately, while she was thrown clear. The last passenger died from his wounds in hospital.

In August 2014, Oleh Liashko, leader of the Ukrainian Radical Party, visited the Aidar Battalion, appeared on television with Tolopa, called her a true patriot, and said he would request Ukrainian nationality for her. This caused her harm when the video was aired on NTV Russian television, as part of a story about her. The NTV story focused on how she grew up, and what caused her to betray her origin by fighting for another country. After the Russian media coverage, her family was threatened and stopped speaking to her. Her maternal uncle, an official of the Federal Security Service (FSB) declared he would bring her back to Russia from Ukraine. The Russian authorities opened three criminal cases against her, for extremism, terrorism, and mercenaryism. In 2026, she was sentenced, in absentia, to nine years in a penal colony. From 2015, Ukrainian media ran regular stories about her as a rare Russian woman fighting for Ukraine.

=== Maternal leave ===
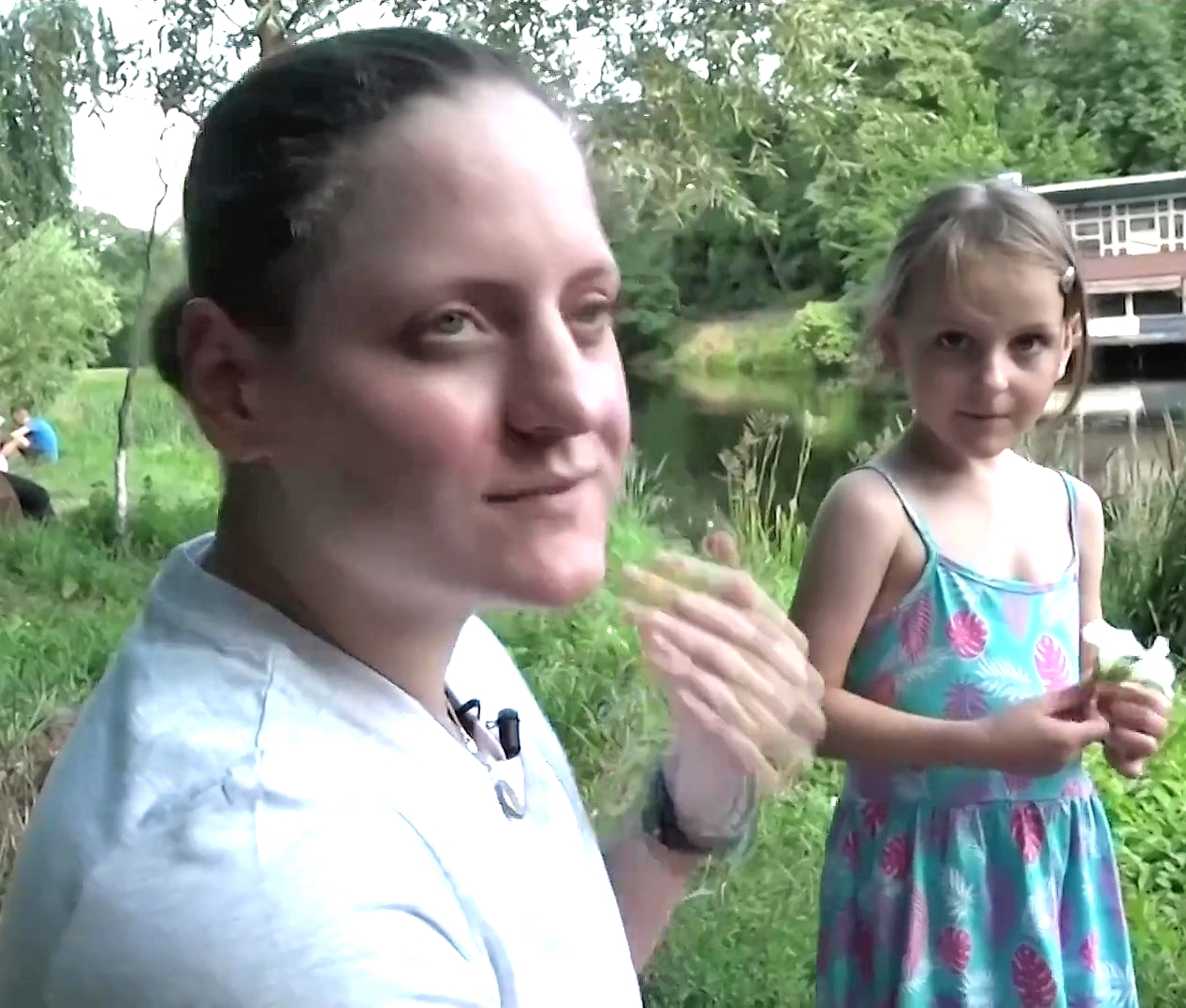
Tolopa with daughter in 2021

Tolopa fought for almost a year at the front, then left because of her sixth-month pregnancy. The father is Ukrainian, but they didn't marry or even keep in touch. She gave birth to a daughter, Miroslava, in Kyiv in 2015. Her mother only resumed speaking to her by phone after the birth. Tolopa and Miroslava lived in a Kyiv apartment with a female friend that Tolopa had met at Maidan. Her roommate was nicknamed Belka (squirrel) and was a former fashion designer from Dnipropetrovsk, participated in the war in Donbas, and left after receiving a traumatic brain injury. When she returned to the front, Tolopa left her daughter with a nanny, or a female military friend who lived through the annexation of the Crimea, and had two children.

=== Return to the front ===
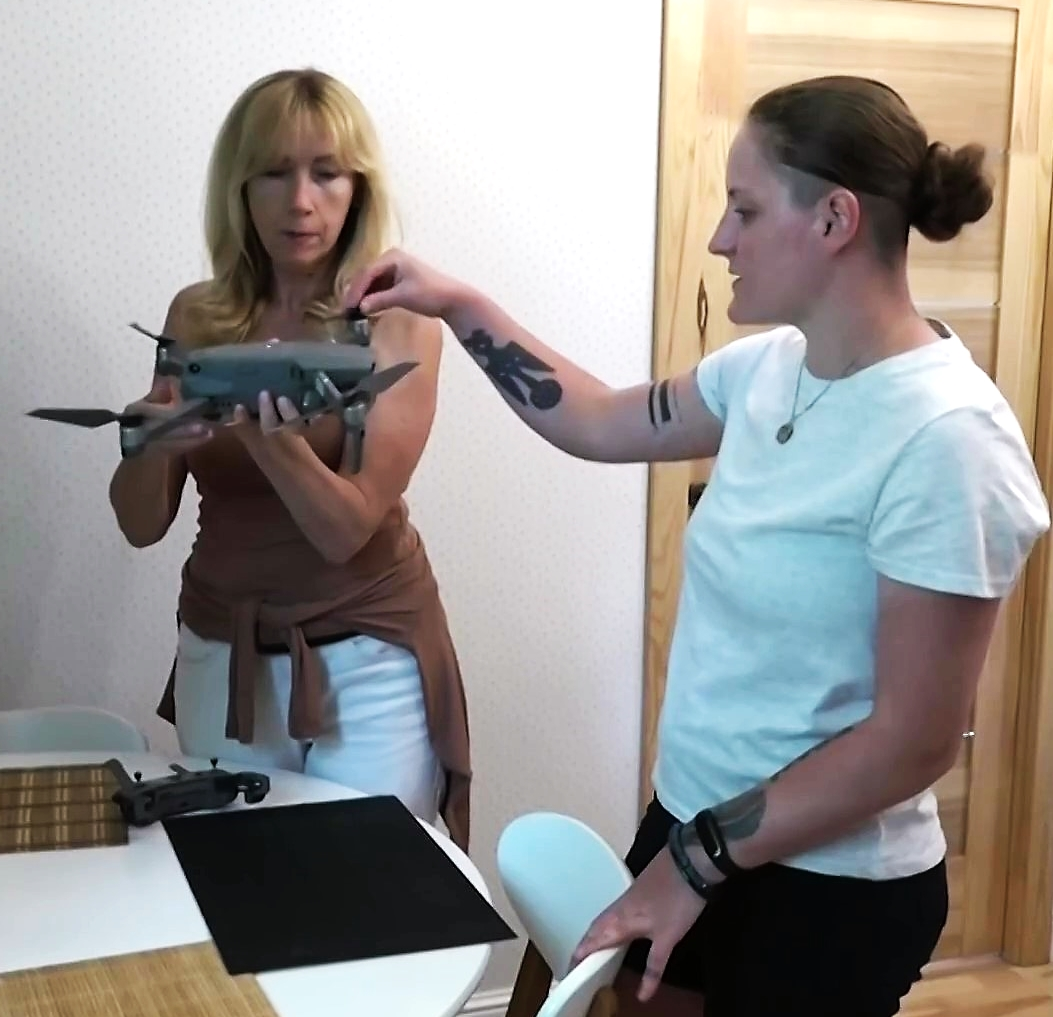
Tolopa (right) demonstrates drone to reporter in 2021

Over the summer of 2016, Tolopa was trained to fly drones by Maria Berlinska, a female Ukrainian volunteer (who also wrote the influential study that allowed women to serve in combat roles). She subsequently volunteered for regular short trips to the Anti-Terrorist Operation Zone doing aerial reconnaissance. By December, Tolopa had signed a contract with the Armed Forces of Ukraine. She was serving as a drone operator in the "Donbas-Ukraine" battalion (reorganized from the former volunteer Donbas Battalion) by January 2017, and in the middle of the year joined the 16th battalion of the 58th Infantry Brigade.

In 2018, she was featured in a photo project about women fighting for Ukraine by Czech photographer David Tesinsky that received international attention, and another by American photojournalist J.T. Blatty, exhibited in 2019–2020. Also in 2018, she was interviewed for a chapter telling her story in Girls Cutting Their Locks, a book about women in the Russo-Ukrainian war published by the Ukrainian Institute of National Remembrance.

== Applying for Ukrainian citizenship ==
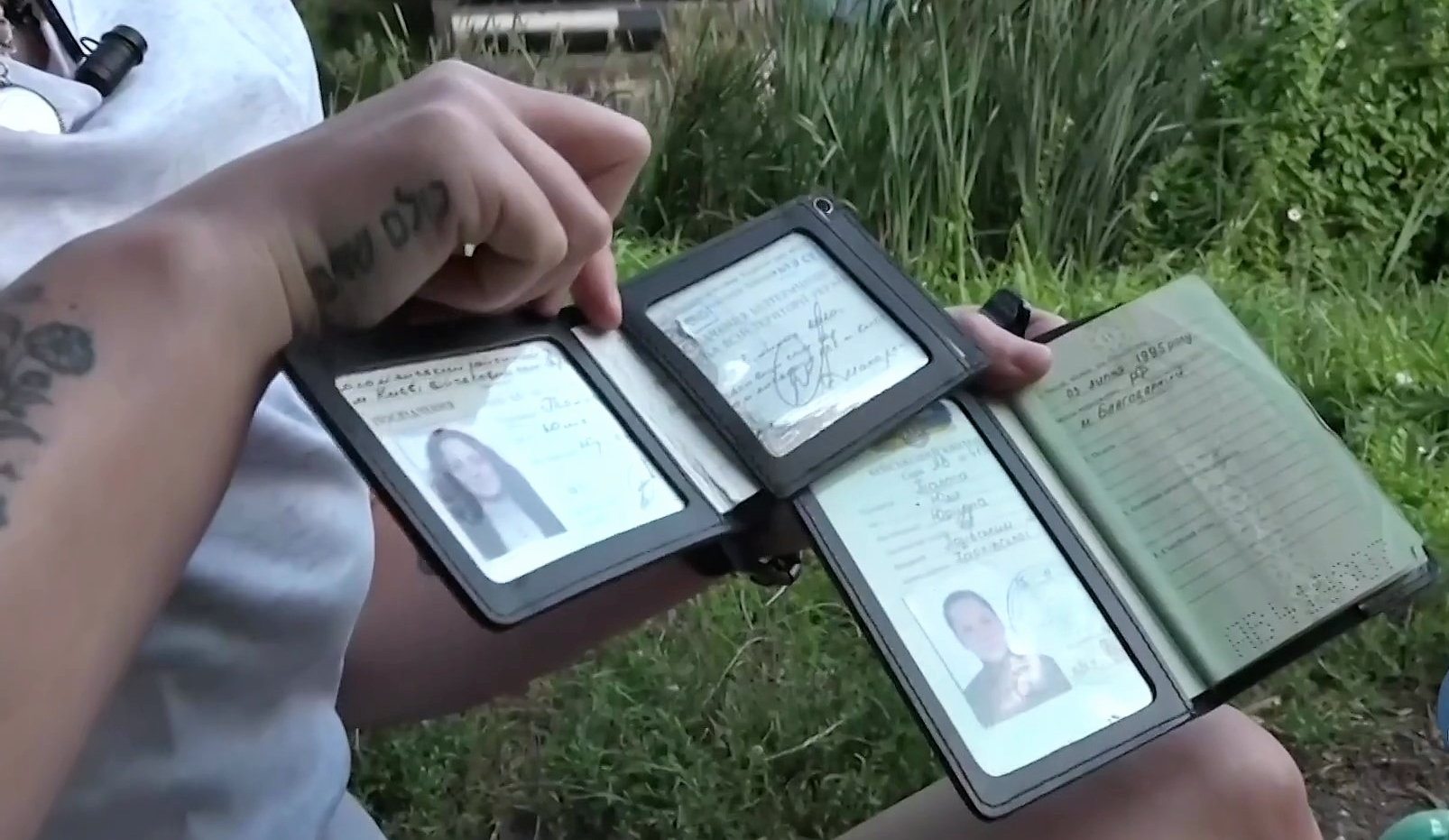
Tolopa's temporary identity documents in July 2021

Tolopa was repeatedly refused Ukrainian citizenship when she applied for it. Friends suggested that she should have a sham marriage with a Ukrainian to get citizenship, but she refused to consider the option. Her Russian passport was destroyed when she was blown up by the mine in 2014, so she was unable to provide it as part of the required paperwork in 2015.

In March 2016, Ukrainian President Petro Poroshenko issued decree No. 120, which allowed foreigners who served in the Ukrainian armed forces under contract to apply for naturalization after a three-year residency. In December 2016, in a televised incident, Tolopa threw tomato juice on the politician Oleh Liashko outside the Verkhovna Rada, accusing him of breaking his promise to help her get Ukrainian citizenship. Liashko said that only the President could grant citizenship, but confirmed that he had requested it for her. Even so, Tolopa was again refused naturalization in January 2017.

In December 2017, Tolopa was denied nationality a third time, this time because she did not have a certificate of non-conviction (lack of criminal record) from Russia, which she would need to get in Russia or from the Russian consulate, where she was afraid to go for fear of detention on Russian sovereign territory. She believed this denial meant she would be deported, and the Kharkiv Human Rights Protection Group appealed on her behalf. The State Migration Service publicly stated that she would not be deported, and could remain in Ukraine indefinitely as a person in need of additional protection. On 5 December, Tolopa was accompanied by friends, fellow soldiers, and members of parliament (Nadiya Savchenko, Ihor Lutsenko, Mustafa Nayyem, and Serhiy Melnichuk) to protect her from being detained as she went to the Russian consulate in Kyiv to request her certificate.

In June 2019, President Volodymyr Zelenskyy named her among 14 foreigners granted citizenship by presidential decree for fighting for Ukraine. The decree specified that those bestowed citizenship would have to provide necessary documentation to meet requirements of the migration service, but granted them the right to a two-year temporary passport. One of those requirements included that Tolopa formally renounce her Russian citizenship. Russia would not allow her to renounce her Russian citizenship, because she had criminal charges and a request for her extradition pending against her (for fighting for Ukraine). Because the period for the two-year temporary passport had expired, an extension of the processing period was submitted to the Rada. They kept refusing to approve the extension through July and October 2021, which, in theory, could have lost Tolopa her conferred citizenship.

Tolopa went to court in October 2021 and obtained a ruling that she could submit a declaration of renunciation to the migration service because obtaining the documents for renunciation posed a threat to her well-being. Though she turned in the required documentation, the migration department appealed the decision; they lost their appeal. Finally, in December 2021, Tolopa completed the citizenship process and received a Ukrainian passport.

== Personal life ==
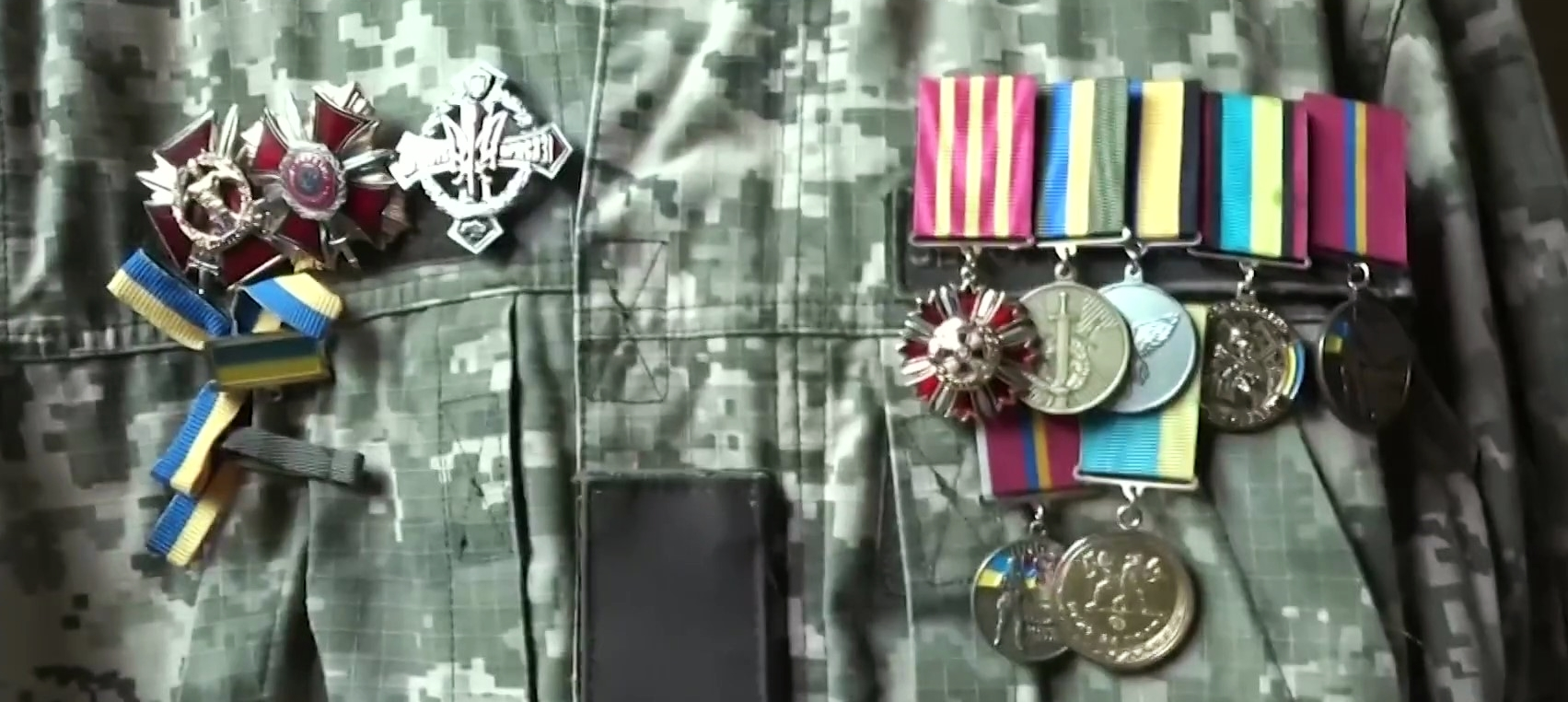
Tolopa's medals

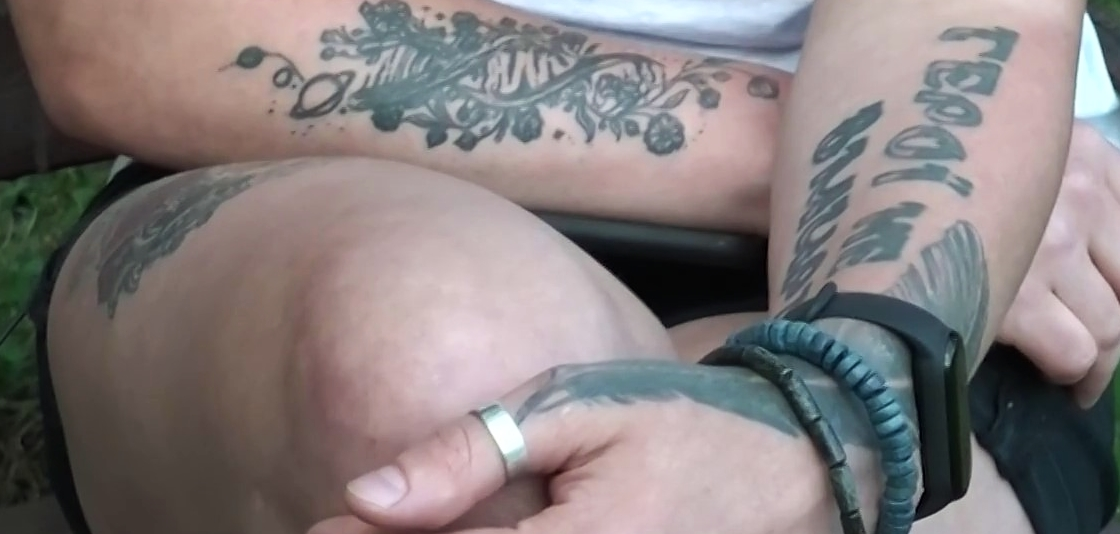
Tolopa's tattoos, "Heroes don't die" and Valkyrie wings

By mid-2016, Tolopa was in a relationship with a woman and in June, she appeared in a video promoting the third Kyiv Pride LGBT rights March for Equality. She had become fluent in Ukrainian, having taught herself the language from the poems of Serhiy Zhadan and Kateryna Babkina. She enjoyed poetry and wrote poems about her own life, but never about the war. By 2017, she spoke "almost without Russianisms", and said she felt herself more Ukrainian than Russian.

Tolopa earned multiple medals for fighting in Eastern Ukraine; the one she treasures most is called "Brother for Brother", given to foreigners fighting for Ukraine. She has 13 tattoos. The first, "Heroes don't die" (ГЕРОЇ НЕ ВМИРАЮТЬ), she had put on her arm in the Maidan, in memory of the fallen. "All are equal" (כולם שווים) is on her hand in Hebrew, in support of the March for Equality for sexual minorities. She shares those two with Belka. Wings on her wrist are the sign of the Valkyrie. She had a Ukrainian trident tattooed on her back after hearing of a prisoner who had his hand cut off by the Russians for having one there.

In 2019, Tolopa quit the army, to spend more time with her daughter who otherwise barely saw her, but remained in the Ukrainian military reserve. She returned to school in 2021, when her daughter entered school, but did not return to medicine, opting to study at the Law and International Relations faculty of the Open International University of Human Development "Ukraine". During the 2022 Russian invasion of Ukraine, Tolopa initially planned to return to military service to defend her adopted country, but then changed her mind, to care for her daughter. They sheltered in western Ukraine.
