= Kyiv Photo Book International Festival =

Ukrainian annual photo book festival

The Kyiv Photo Book International Festival is the first and only festival of photo books in Ukraine. Established in 2018, the festival consists of a fair of art and documentary photo books and photographic prints, an exhibition of private collections of photo books, presentations of photo books and such projects in progress, educational program, and review of photo book projects by experts (book dummy review).

Festival participants consist of photo book publishers, photographers, photo unions, photographic and art institutions, and photo book vendors.

According to festival founder and director Dmitriy Krakovich, the festival's goals are developing the photography art market in Ukraine, creating a place for international photographic culture exchange in Kyiv, and pursuing better global recognition of Ukrainian photography.

== Editions ==
The festival is a semiannual event. The first edition took place in February 2019, and the second in September 2019. The festival was not held in 2020 due to the COVID-19 pandemic.

In its second edition the festival presented photo books by participants from 11 countries: Iceland, Italy, France, Georgia, Germany, Poland, Singapore, Ukraine, United Kingdom, United States, and Venezuela.

== Other festival events ==
The festival conducted two reviews of photo book projects by experts (similar to book dummy reviews): first – in May 2019, second – in January 2020.

In October 2019 the festival made a presentation of most prominent Ukrainian photo books in New York City at the Ukrainian Institute of America. Two similar presentations were done later in Ukraine: in November 2019 in Kyiv, and in January 2020 in Dnipro.
