= J. T. Blatty =

American photojournalist (born 1978)

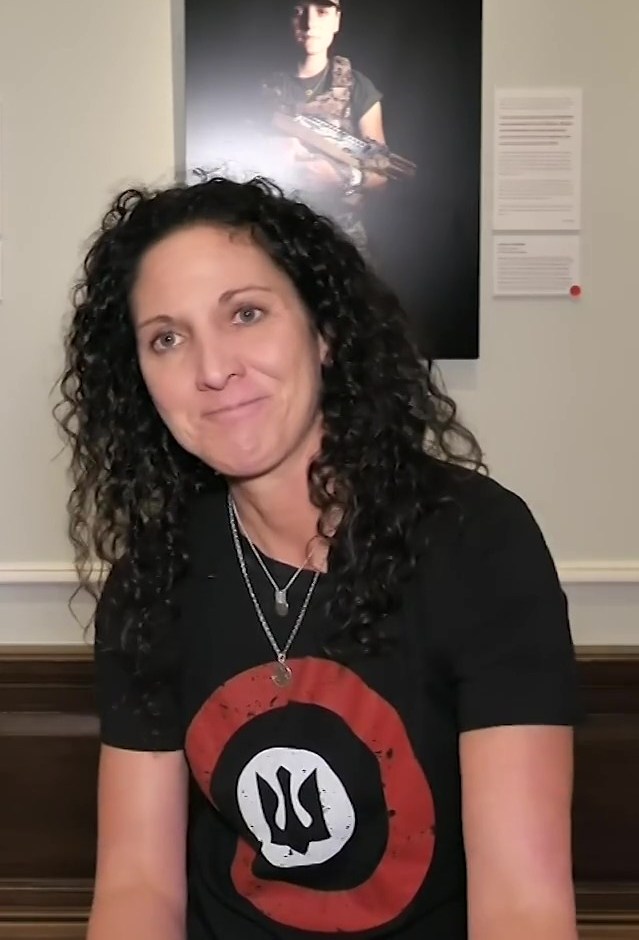
- Blatty at Frontline / Peace Life exhibition in 2020, in front of her portrait of "Valkyrie" Yulia Tolopa
- Born: Jennifer Tuero Blatty; 1978 (age 47–48); New Orleans, Louisiana, U.S.
- Education: United States Military Academy
- Occupation: Photojournalism
- Years active: 2006–present
- Parents: William Peter Blatty (father); Linda Tuero (mother)
- Relatives: Mika (second cousin); Germanos Mouakkad (great-great-uncle)
- Website: Official website

Jennifer Tuero Blatty (born 1978) is an American photojournalist, author, former army captain, and college athlete. The daughter of tennis player Linda Tuero and writer and filmmaker William Peter Blatty, she was a star tennis player at the United States Military Academy at West Point. She served six years in the United States Army including in the United States invasion of Afghanistan, and the 2003 invasion of Iraq. After military service she became a photojournalist. She wrote and photographed for newspapers, magazines, and the Federal Emergency Management Agency, and published photobooks about communities in the United States South. Since 2018 she has been documenting Ukrainian military volunteers and soldiers in the Russo-Ukrainian War. She has published a memoir of her time as a soldier and war journalist.

== Family and early life ==
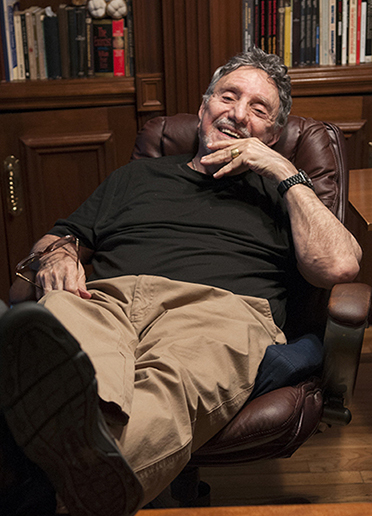
William Peter Blatty in 2009, photograph by J. T. Blatty

Jennifer Tuero Blatty was born in New Orleans, Louisiana in 1978, to tennis player and paleoanthropologist Linda Tuero and author and filmmaker William Peter Blatty. Each parent married several times, and she has multiple half-siblings; full brother Billy Blatty became a restaurateur and entrepreneur. In 1996 she graduated from St. Martin's Episcopal School, which her mother had also attended.

She is the second cousin of singer Mika and the great-great-niece of Melkite bishop Germanos Mouakkad.

== West Point and military service ==
Blatty attended the United States Military Academy at West Point from 1996 to 2000. While there, she was a standout athlete in women's tennis. She was part of the Patriot League all-star tennis singles team each of her four years, and doubles in 1997. She amassed a record 27 career wins at number 1 ranked women's tennis singles. She was a captain of the women's tennis team in the 1999–2000 school year, and her team, the Army Black Knights, won the League title in both 1999 and 2000. She also won the most valuable player of the Patriot League. After graduation, she was listed in the Patriot League's All-Decade and 25th Anniversary women's tennis teams, and in 2026 was added to the Army Sports Hall of Fame.

Blatty was also the first female boxer competing for West Point, winning her first match against Lock Haven University in 2000. Her coaches said her boxing and tennis training helped each other.

After graduation, Blatty served as a platoon leader in the 92nd Engineer Battalion. She was among the first troops deployed into the 2002 United States invasion of Afghanistan, and afterwards in the 2003 invasion of Iraq. By 2005 she was a captain, and rear detachment commander for the 92nd. She served a total of six years in the United States Army.

== Photojournalism ==
As an amateur photographer before military service, she continued to take photographs throughout her deployments, and send rolls of film and exposed disposable cameras home to her family. It was in Afghanistan that she says that she became drawn to capturing the world around her; she tried to turn her story and photographs into a book, and wrote 30,000 words before pausing. Blatty had been stationed at Fort Stewart during her army career, and stayed in Savannah, Georgia afterwards, coaching tennis and doing freelance photography and writing. She credits Zig Jackson, documentary photographer and professor at Savannah College of Art & Design, who attended her first exhibition in 2006, for urging her to hone her craft by learning the darkroom, and taking a 2009 internship with National Geographic Traveler. In 2010, she published Who Dat Nation, a book of photographs documenting the euphoria after the New Orleans Saints football team winning Super Bowl XLIV, some of which were also published in the Traveler.

Starting in 2011, Blatty took courses at the Duke University Center for Documentary Studies (CDS), getting a certificate in 2013. After her CDS courses, she also became a Federal Emergency Management Agency (FEMA) Disaster Reservist Photographer.

Selected FEMA photographs by J. T. Blatty

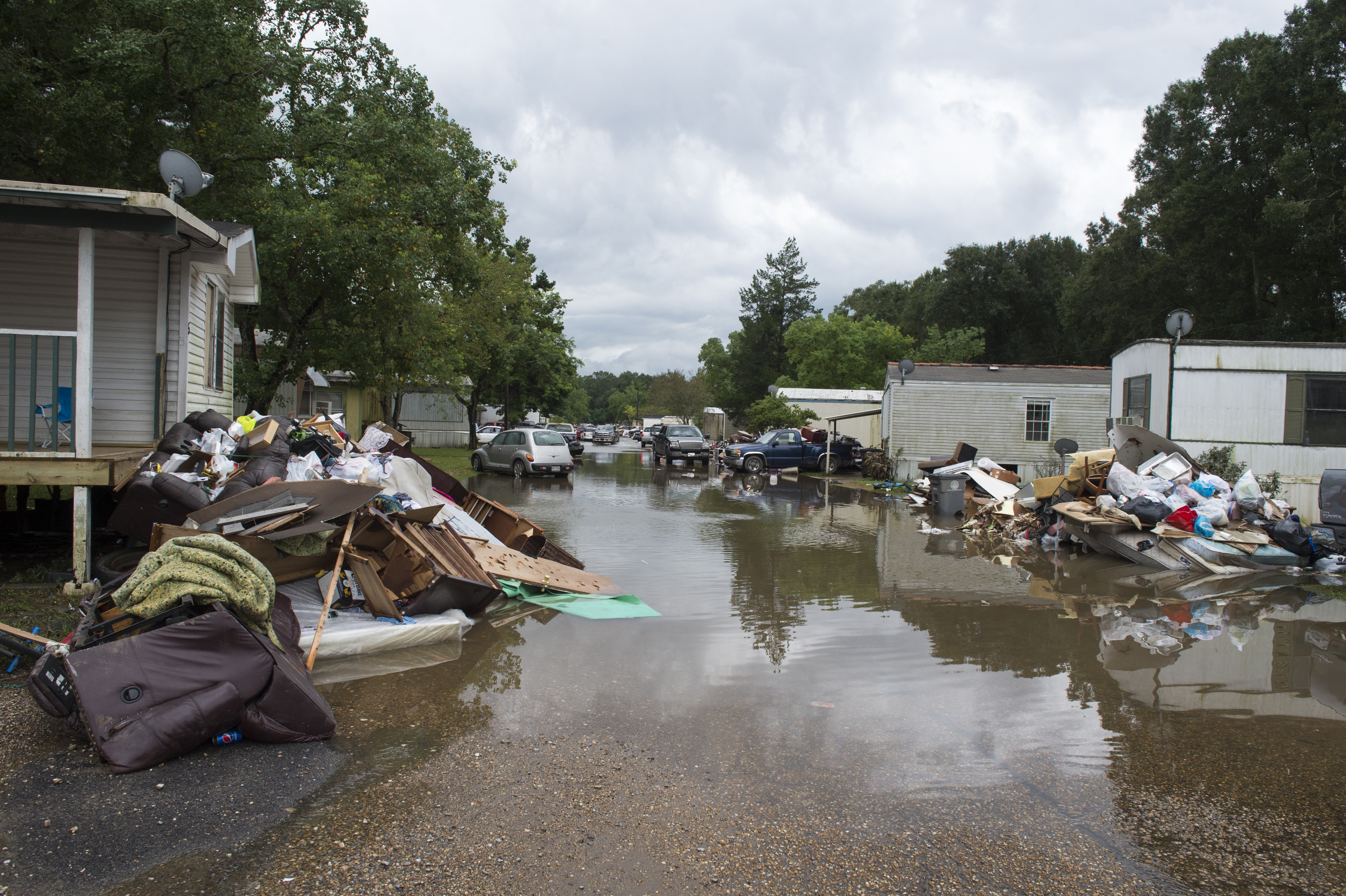
Piles of debris line the side of the roads in flood affected areas one week after the 2016 severe flooding in Baton Rouge

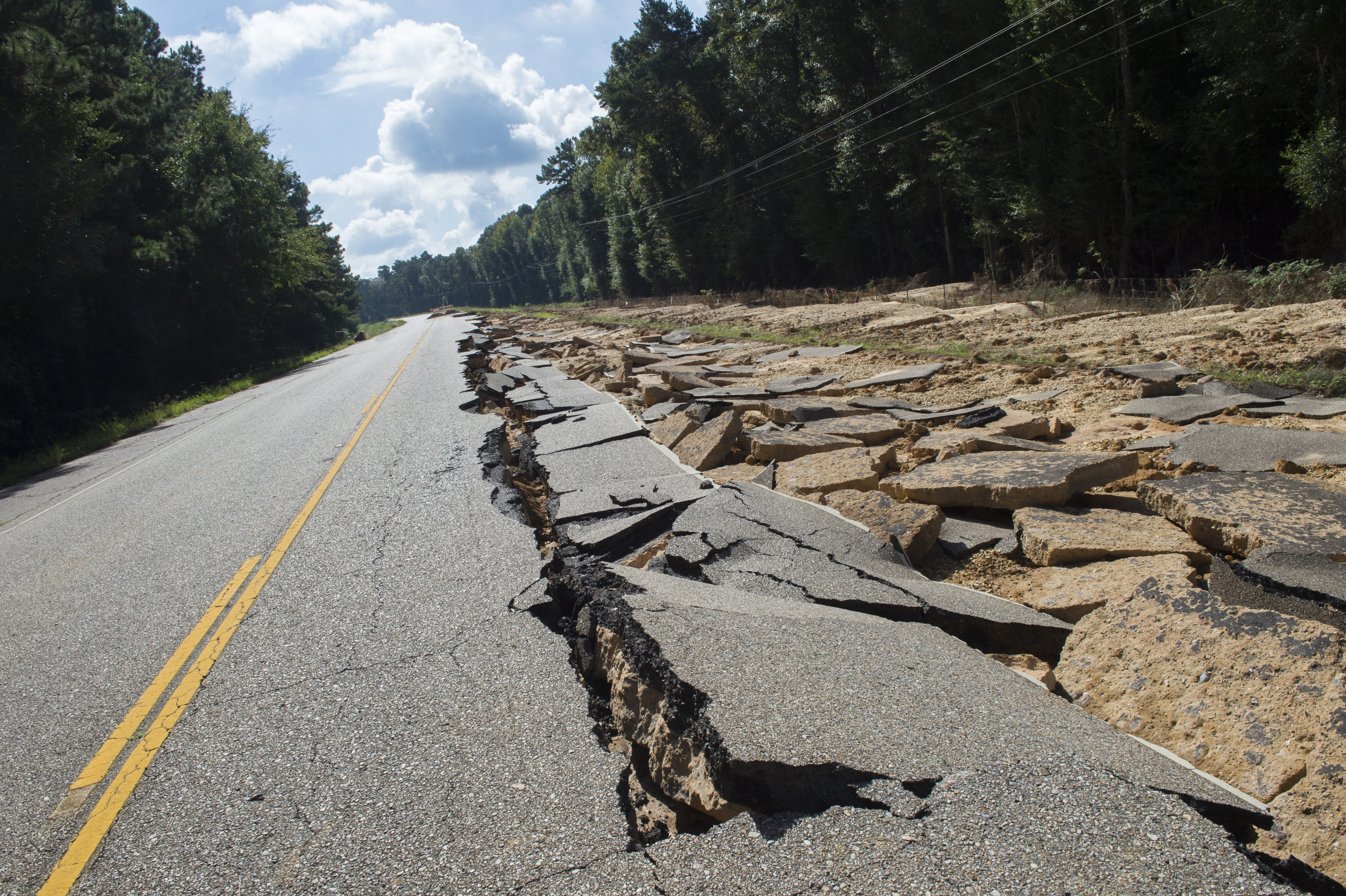
A crumbled section of LA 10 near Clinton, Louisiana, one month after 2016 flooding

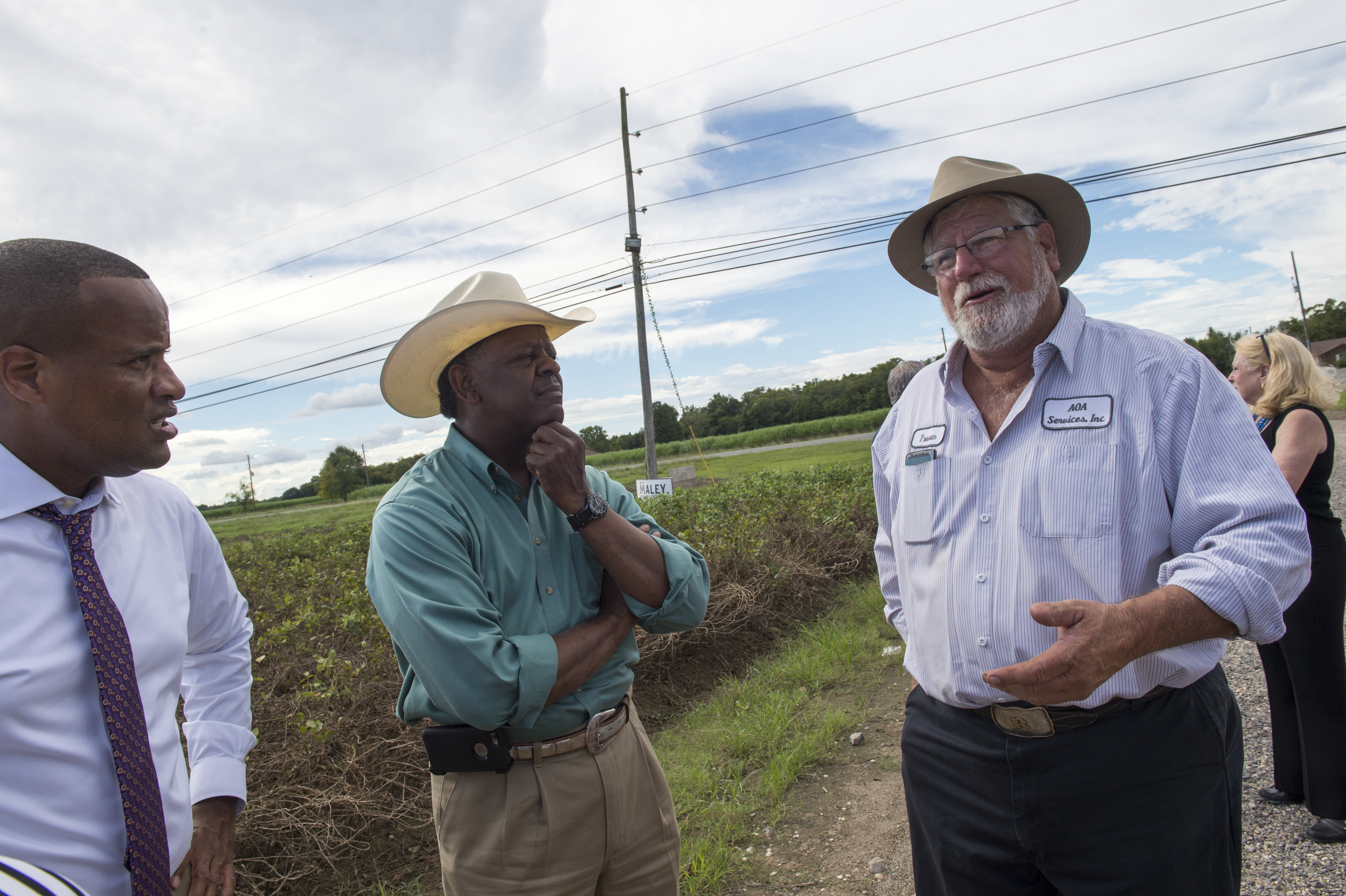
A farmer describes the loss of his crops, Sept 13, 2016

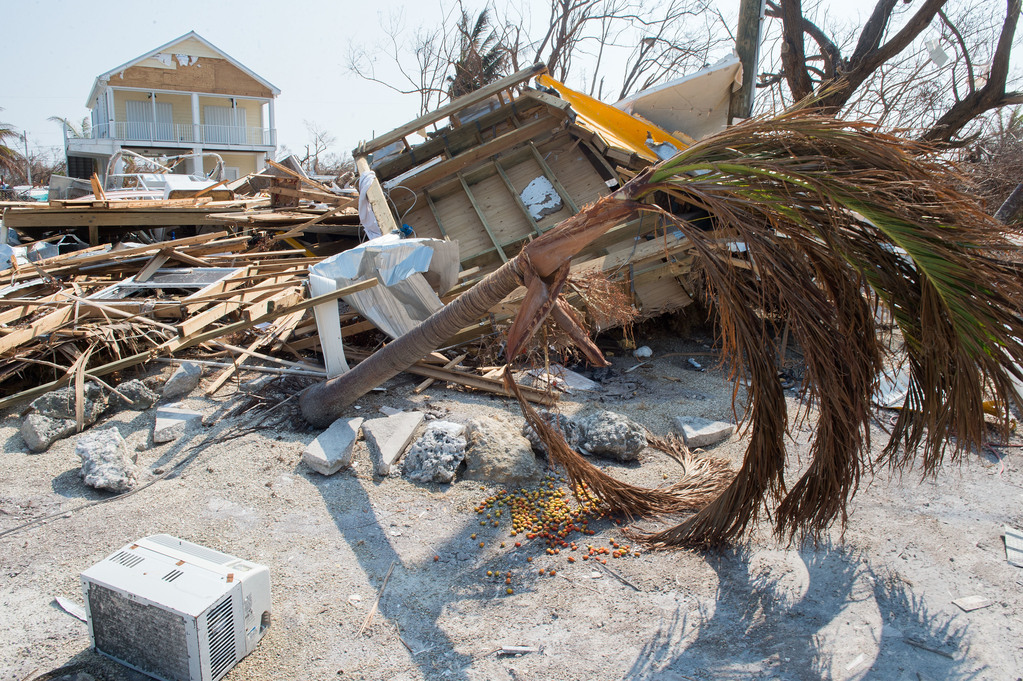
Remains of a neighborhood destroyed by Hurricane Irma Sept. 20, 2017

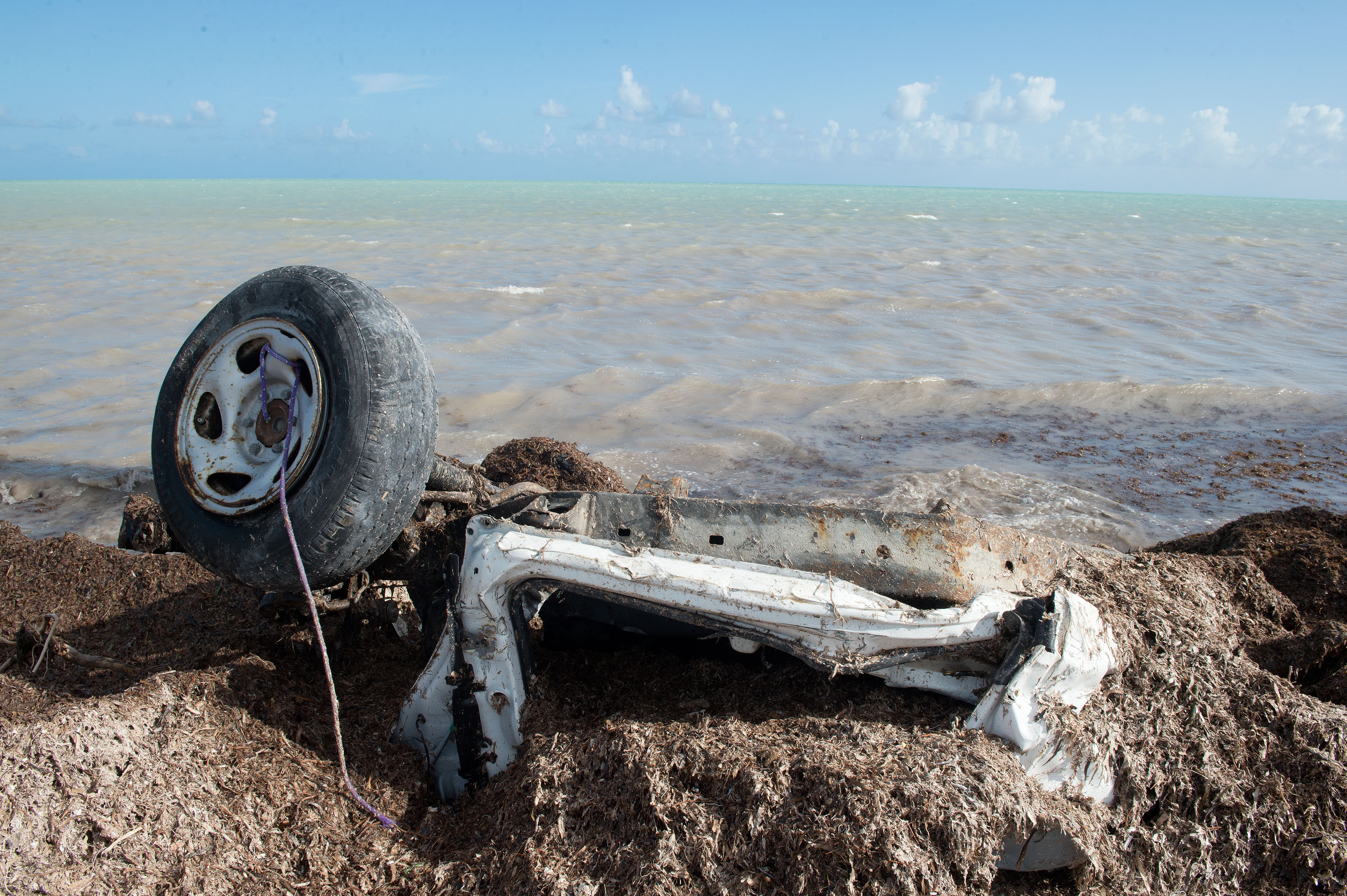
Remains of a car on the side of Overseas Highway, following Irma, Oct. 10, 2017

Blatty made several fine art photography exhibitions at the Martine Chaisson gallery in New Orleans. "Parallel" was a 2012 exhibit of fossils displayed on nudes. "Happy Dogs" was a 2015 exhibit of motion blur photographs of colorful light traces left by active dogs at night; 10% of its profits went to dog rescue missions.

In September 2018, Blatty published Fish Town: Down the Road to Louisiana's Fishing Communities (George F. Thompson Publishing, ISBN 9781938086519). It was a 200-page book with 137 color photographs taken over six years, mostly in St. Bernard, Tangipahoa and Plaquemines parishes, with recollections from the people of the coastal communities sustained by fishing. It won the Bronze for Best Regional Non-Fiction (South) from the Independent Publisher Book Awards in 2020. Its release was accompanied by an exhibition of the photographs in the book at the Martine Chaisson gallery. Blatty had written a story about the collapse of regional fisheries for Connect Savannah magazine in 2008, but went back to her home state for this long-term project.

=== Ukraine ===
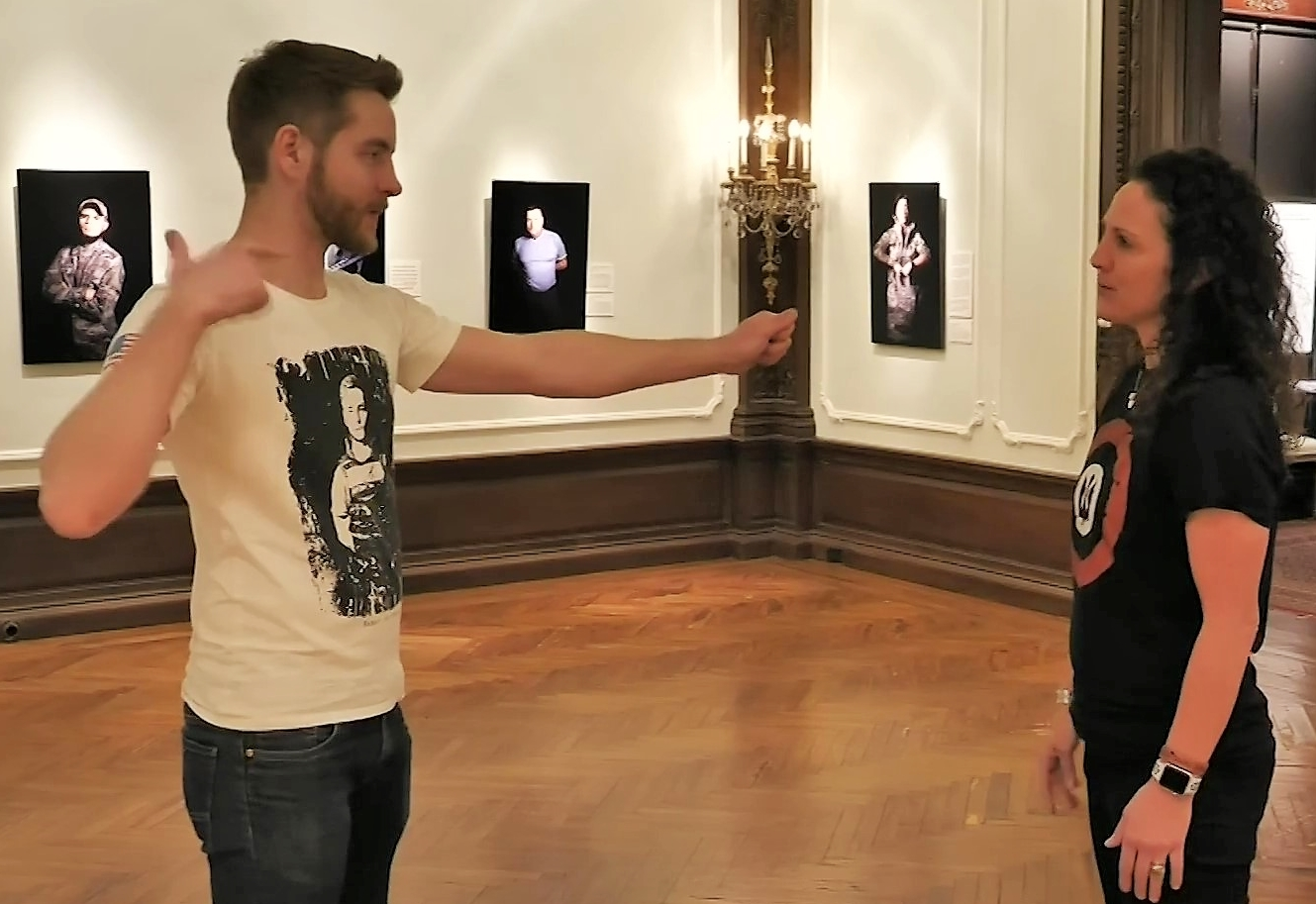
Ukrainian veteran Dmytro Lavrenchuk (left) with Blatty at "Frontline / Peace Life" exhibition in 2020

After finishing Fish Town in 2018, Blatty spent a month as an embedded journalist among the volunteer Ukrainian soldiers of the war in Donbas. Her photos and recorded oral histories became an exhibition titled "Frontline / Peace Life: Ukraine’s Revolutionaries of the Forgotten War", which was presented at the Ukrainian National Museum in Chicago in May 2019, and the Ukrainian Institute of America in New York City in 2020. Dmytro Lavrenchuk and Alina Viatina, Ukrainian veterans from the photos, accompanied Blatty to the exhibitions to tell their stories in person. The project was a finalist for the 2019 Lange-Taylor Prize for documentary photography.

Blatty returned to photograph Ukraine veterans regularly over the next years, including with West Point classmate and veteran activist Dylan Tete and former Secretary of Veterans Affairs Bob McDonald. In November 2020, Blatty received the 2020-21 Fulbright Program U.S. Scholar Award to Ukraine, which she used to continue documenting Ukraine's volunteer soldiers, the latest project to be called "Transition Within Conflict and Across Borders". In November 2021, she appeared on the third season of Ukrainian reality television program Крутий Заміс, about veterans starting businesses.

Blatty's book Snapshots Sent Home: From Afghanistan, Iraq, Ukraine - A Memoir was published by Elva Resa Publishing on February 20, 2024 (ISBN 978-1934617816). It is a memoir, partially of her experiences serving in Iraq and Afghanistan, but centering on her time photographing the Russo-Ukrainian war, and interviewing the veterans there. It won the 2024 Silver Award for War & Military from Foreword Reviews. In 2025, it was released as an audiobook by Tantor Media, and translated into Ukrainian language as Плем'я війни (War Tribe) by Tamara Duda (ISBN 978-617-8137-08-3, Komora Books).
