= Germanos Mouakkad =

Melkite priest and bishop

Germanos Mouakkad (born April 1853 in Damascus, Syria - died on 11 February 1912 in Beirut) was a Melkite priest and bishop of the Melkite Greek Catholic Archeparchy of Baalbek. He was the maternal great-uncle of William Peter Blatty, bestselling American author of The Exorcist, and the great-great-uncle of photojournalist J. T. Blatty and singer Mika.

== Life ==
Germanos Mouakkad was born in the beginning of April 1853, son of Issa Mouakkad and his wife Marie Kayata. His parents were Melkites. At his baptism he received the name Joseph. Up to the age of twelve, he attended a Christian school in his home parish, after which he worked as an assistant to a merchant.

At sixteen he became—against the fierce resistance of his mother—a novice in the Basilian Monastery of the Holy Savior, where a monk named Ignace accepted him. After spending some years with Joseph Bakos studying philosophy, he was ordained by Clément Bahous priest and served as chaplain in Cairo and Damascus. From 1880 to 1886 Mouakkad was Patriarchal Vicar of the Melkite Patriarch of Jerusalem. On 16 March 1886, he received the episcopal ordination and was—now called Germanos—Bishop of the Eparchy of Baalbek. In 1896 Mouakkad received during his stay in Rome by Pope Leo XIII's permission, a medal for missionary priests and in 1903 established a missionary company to priests called Missionary Society of St. Paul in Harissa, Lebanon.

Germanos Mouakkad died on February 11, 1912, in a French hospital in Beirut from the effects of long-term illness.

In 2014 a Lebanese stamp was issued with his picture.
