= Tankhouse =

Water tower enclosed by siding

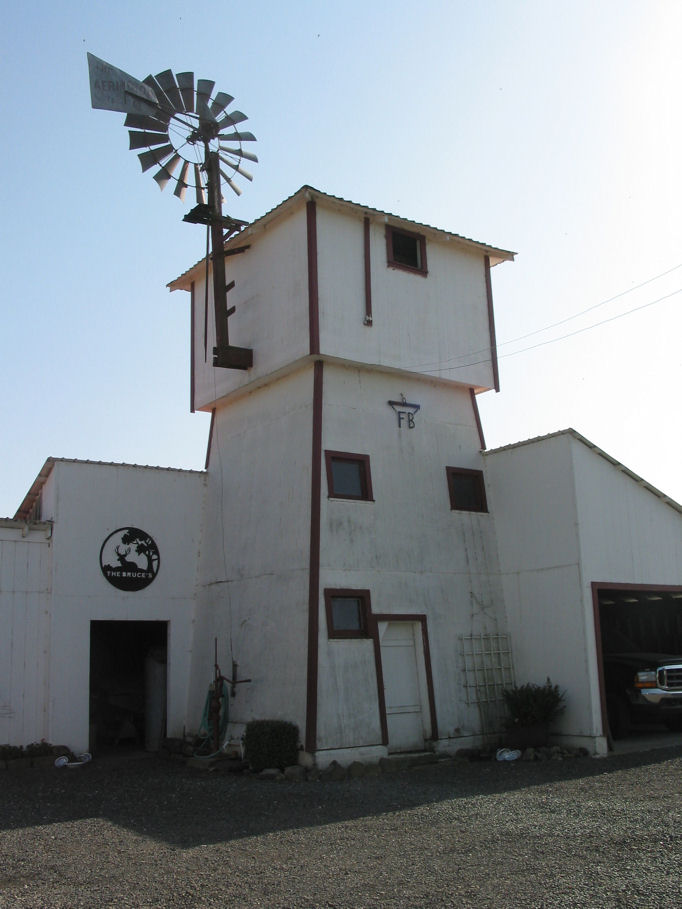
Tankhouse, Sonoma County, California

A tankhouse (also spelled tank house or tank-house) is a water tower enclosed by siding. Tankhouses were part of a self-contained domestic water system supplying the house and garden, developed before the advent of electricity and municipal water mains. The system consisted of a windmill, a hand-dug well and the tankhouse. The windmill pumped water from the well up into the tank at the top of the tankhouse, from where it flowed down under gravity pressure to the house and garden. The system used no fuel or electricity.

== Synonyms ==
The tankhouse is sometimes called a pump-house, a well-house, a well-tower or just a water tower. But whatever it is called, it is a water tower that is enclosed by siding. The siding is what makes it a "house", with usable interior space. Ordinary water towers, with a tank on top of an open tower, are not tankhouses. The term is also used for an unrelated structure in the copper-refining industry.

== History ==
Tankhouses are an important part of California's historical heritage and the state's early material culture. Many thousands were built in both town and country from the 1850s to the 1930s, almost exclusively of redwood — tower, water tank, siding and roof shingles — at a time when the state's abundant redwood forests seemed inexhaustible. The windmill, which stood over the well, was usually attached to the tower, but sometimes stood on a separate tower. Tankhouses became obsolete with the coming of deep, drilled wells and electric pumps in the countryside and water mains in the towns. Almost all of the hand-dug wells have been filled in now, and most of the windmills have disappeared. The remaining tankhouses are an endangered species, threatened by constant commercial, residential, industrial and agricultural development. Their numbers dwindle with each passing year, and of those that remain, many suffer from lack of maintenance.

== Geographic distribution ==
There are far more tankhouses in California than in any other state, and they most probably originated in California. A tankhouse was built in Mendocino, California, in 1857 and many tankhouses in a variety of designs are still standing in that village. Tankhouses can be found in most of the state's 58 counties, wherever there was water not more than 50 feet or so below the surface. Probably after transcontinental and branch railroads were completed, tankhouses were built in other western states, the midwest, and even in the east.

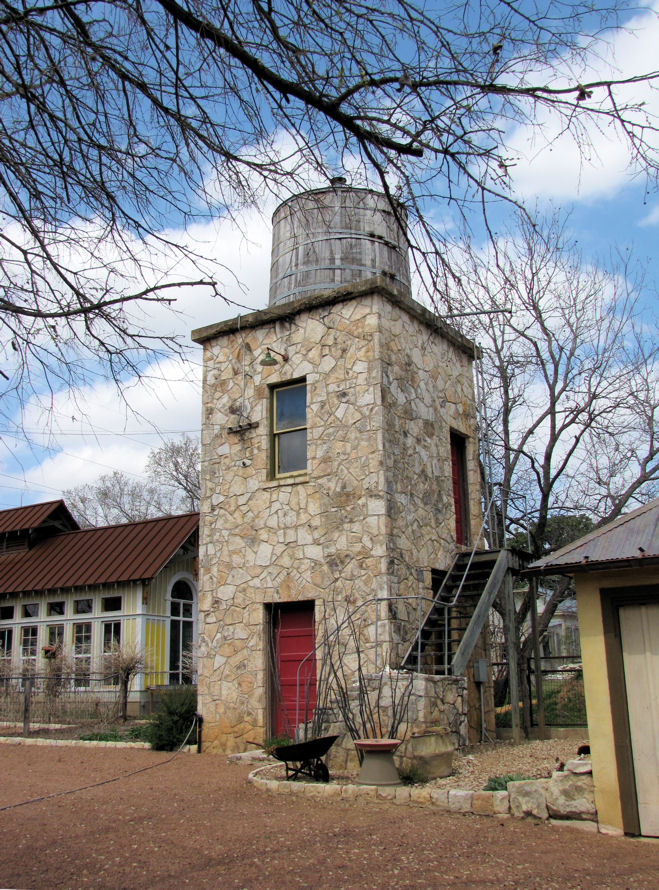
Tankhouse, Comfort, Texas

There is an interesting but as yet not well documented cluster of tankhouses in the Texas hill country west of Austin, where German immigrants settled in the last half of the 19th century. They found no redwood, but there was plenty of limestone, and cypress trees along the creeks: they built their towers of limestone and their tanks out of cypress wood. It is possible that the tankhouse idea traveled from California to Texas, but it is also possible that the early German immigrants conceived the idea themselves or brought it with them from Germany. The cypress tanks, sometimes called cisterns in Texas, were always exposed on top of the limestone towers, and the windmills stood on separate towers over the nearby well. Later, tankhouses in the same area were built of concrete with steel or concrete tanks, and a few were built of wood in the California style. In Texas the windmill always stood on a separate tower.

== Types ==
In California, several types of tankhouse can be seen today. The supporting tower may have vertical or sloping sides. The tankroom (top floor) may also have vertical or sloping sides, and may or may not overhang the tower. On many tankhouses the redwood tank is not enclosed by siding but exposed, with or without a roof above it. In some areas one type predominates. Other variants occur, particularly among those built in the 19th century. Cooper illustrates four early examples with octagonal towers. Pitman includes drawings of six types, one of which is now rare, with the supporting structure wider than the tankroom. Manning includes drawings of five types, including the same rare type. Thorsheim also illustrates five types. Many tankhouses have lost the top (tank) level, making it hard to know the original design. Windmills were usually attached to the tankhouse, but sometimes were on their own tower. Most of the windmills have disappeared.

== Sources ==
- Cooper, Thomas, Tankhouse: California’s Redwood Water Towers from a Bygone Era, Barn Owl Press, Santa Rosa, 2011. This is the only published book on the subject and the primary source of information for this article.
- Levy, Robert, and Louise Levy, Windmills, Water Towers and Tankhouses of Santa Clara County, Bob and Louise Levy Publishing, Cupertino, 1996. A Xerox^{R} compilation of photos and notes made by Girl Scouts of Santa Clara County as an "above-ground archeology project" for the Bicentennial in 1976.
- Pitman, Leon, ‘Domestic Tankhouses of Rural California’ Pioneer America 8:84-97, 1976.
- Smith, Wally, ‘Water Towers and Windmills of Mendocino’ Mendocino Historical Review VIII (Winter) 1993.
- Baker, T. Lindsay, A Field Guide to American Windmills, University of Oklahoma Press, Norman, 1985.
- Manning, Roger S., Windmills and Water Towers of California, unpublished Masters Thesis, University of California, Davis, 1969.
- Thorsheim, Katie W., Domestic Tankhouses in the Rogue Valley, unpublished Masters Thesis, Southern Oregon State College, Ashland, 1991.
