= Harry F. Sinclair House =

Mansion in Manhattan, New York

- U.S. National Register of Historic Places
- U.S. National Historic Landmark
- New York State Register of Historic Places
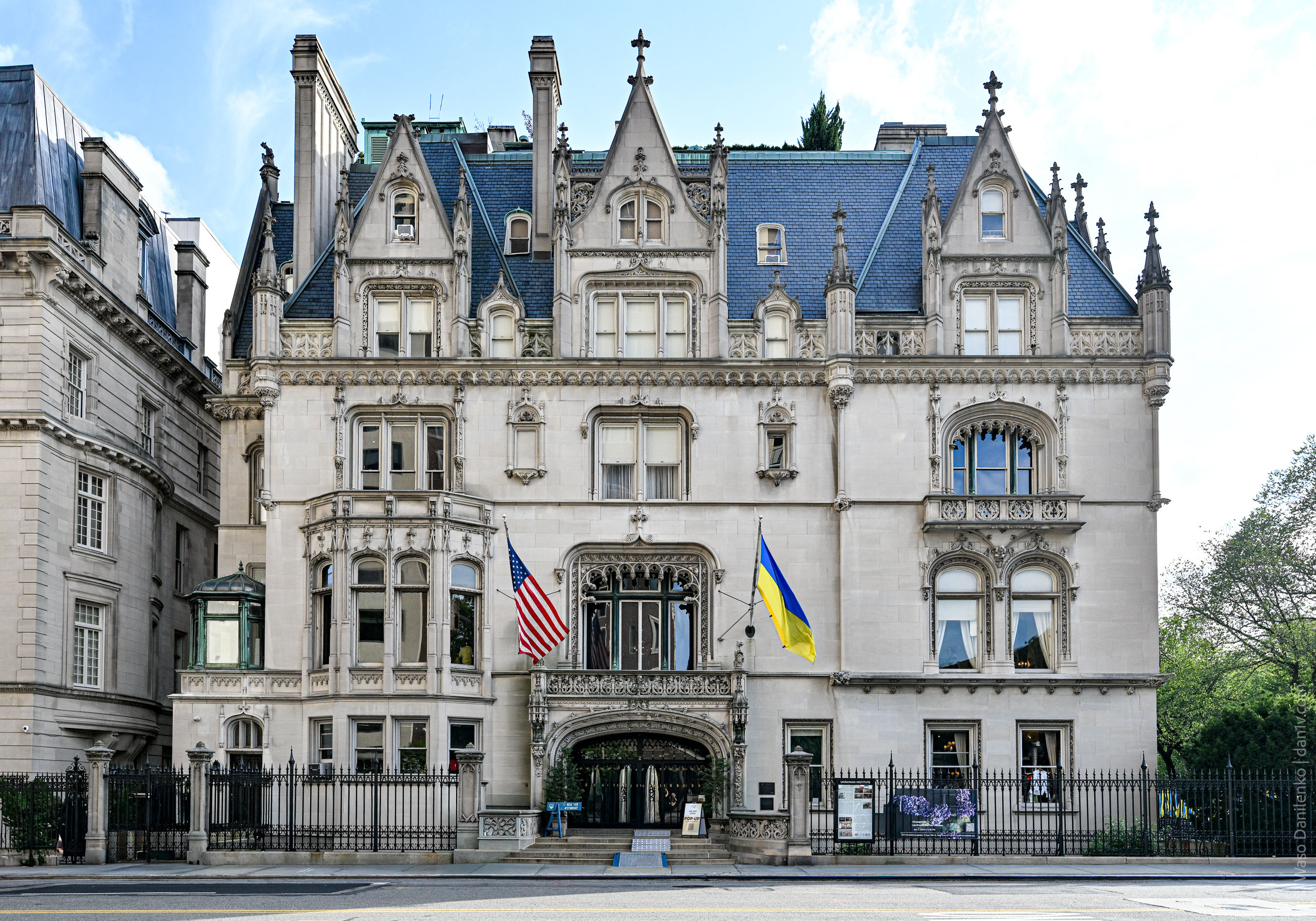
- The main entrance on East 79th Street in 2025
- Interactive map of Harry F. Sinclair House
- Location: Manhattan, New York, U.S.
- Coordinates: 40°46′36″N 73°57′49″W
- Built: 1897–1899
- Architect: C. P. H. Gilbert (Note: Following the Sinclair House's purchase by the UIA in 1955, New York newspapers attributed its design to Stanford White, but the research of the New York City Landmarks Preservation Commission found that Gilbert was the architect.)
- Architectural style: French Renaissance, eclectic
- NRHP reference No.: 78001882
- NYSRHP No.: 06101.001767

Significant dates
- Added to NRHP: June 2, 1978
- Designated NHL: June 2, 1978
- Designated NYSRHP: June 23, 1980

The Harry F. Sinclair House (also the Isaac D. Fletcher House or Fletcher–Sinclair Mansion) is a mansion at the southeast corner of East 79th Street and Fifth Avenue on the Upper East Side of Manhattan in New York City, New York, U.S. The house was built between 1897 and 1899. Over the first half of the 20th century, the house was successively the residence of businessmen Isaac D. Fletcher and Harry F. Sinclair, and then the descendants of Peter Stuyvesant, the last Director of New Netherland. The Ukrainian Institute of America acquired the home in 1955, and the institute renovated the building in the 1990s. The house was added to the National Register of Historic Places (NRHP) and was named a National Historic Landmark in 1978.

The mansion was designed in an eclectic French Renaissance style by C. P. H. Gilbert and built by foreman Harvey Murdock. The building largely retains its original design, except for a tankhouse on the roof. Gilbert and Murdock constructed the bulk of the house with brick, which was then faced with limestone ashlar. The northern facade on 79th Street, containing the main entrance, is characterized by multiple windows in square recesses or semi-elliptical and fully Gothic arches. The western facade on Fifth Avenue is symmetrical and dominated by a curved, projecting pavilion. The interior of the mansion comprises 27 rooms on six floors, for a total floor space of 20,000 square feet (1,900 m^{2}). Critical reviews of the house's architecture over its history have been largely positive.

== Site ==
The Harry F. Sinclair House is at 2 East 79th Street on the Upper East Side of Manhattan in New York City, New York, U.S. (Note: According to the 1905 New York Census, the building's first owner, Isaac D. Fletcher, decided against using a Fifth Avenue address and instead used the address 2 East 79th Street; his neighbor, the apparel merchant Isaac Vail Brokaw, did likewise with his manor, across the street at 1 East 79th Street, in 1891.) It is at the southeast corner of Fifth Avenue and 79th Street, directly across from Central Park. The Sinclair House stands on a lot measuring 100 feet (30 m) by 32.2 feet (9.8 m). (Note: According to the New York City Department of City Planning (DCP), the lot has 32.17 feet (9.81 m) of frontage on Fifth Avenue and extends 100 feet (30 m) deep along 79th Street. The DCP cites the lot area as being 3,217 sq ft (298.9 m^{2}).) The dimensions of the building itself are 96 feet (29 m), along East 79th Street, and 30 feet (9.1 m) on Fifth Avenue. The Sinclair House abuts the James B. Duke House and Payne Whitney House immediately to the south. The building is surrounded by a lawn, sunk into the ground, that is itself enclosed by a wrought iron fence, broken only by a stair and balustrade approaching the main entrance, on the north side.

The city block between Fifth Avenue, Madison Avenue, and 78th and 79th Streets was part of the Lenox family farm until 1877, when Marcellus Hartley bought the block for $420,000. The railroad magnate Henry H. Cook acquired the site for $500,000 in 1880. and owned it for the remainder of the 19th century. Cook built a house on the southwest corner of the block in 1883. Cook intended the block to house first-class residences, not high-rises, and only sold lots for the construction of private dwellings. By the early 1910s, the value of the land had increased to $6 million. Through the early 2000s, the block of Fifth Avenue remained largely intact, compared to other parts of Fifth Avenue's "Millionaire's Row".

== History ==
=== Private residence ===
Isaac D. Fletcher was an industrialist and art collector during the late 19th century, who was the president of the New York Coal Tar Company and the Barrett Manufacturing Company. Fletcher purchased a land lot at the corner of Fifth Avenue and 79th Street from Henry H. Cook for $200,000 (equivalent to $7,740,000 in 2025) in 1897. Fletcher, who was planning a house on the block, hired architect C. P. H. Gilbert to design the abode. At the time, Fletcher resided at the Astoria Hotel. The new house's design so impressed Fletcher that he commissioned a painting of the finished residence from Jean-François Raffaëlli in 1899. (Note: The work, entitled The Fletcher Mansion, New York City, is in the collection of the Metropolitan Museum of Art. According to Charles Sterling, who wrote about the painting for the museum, "Raffaëlli must have painted it in 1895 or 1899".) Construction was undertaken by stonemason Harvey Murdock and was completed in 1899 at a total cost of $200,000 (equivalent to $7,740,000 in 2025). After taking ownership of the house, the Fletcher family moved their large art collection there, including paintings by Jacques-Louis David, Thomas Gainsborough, Rembrandt van Rijn, Joshua Reynolds, and Peter Paul Rubens.

Fletcher died at the house in 1917, and in his will bequeathed the property to the Metropolitan Museum of Art. The museum also received the house's collection of 251 paintings. The museum sold the house the next year to oil magnate Harry F. Sinclair, who sold the house in 1930 to Augustus Stuyvesant Jr. and Anne van Horne Stuyvesant, the last direct descendants of Peter Stuyvesant, the final Dutch governor of New Netherland. The siblings resided in the mansion until their deaths in 1953 and 1938 respectively. A skylight above the staircase in the middle of the house was covered in the late 1940s.

=== Ukrainian Institute ===
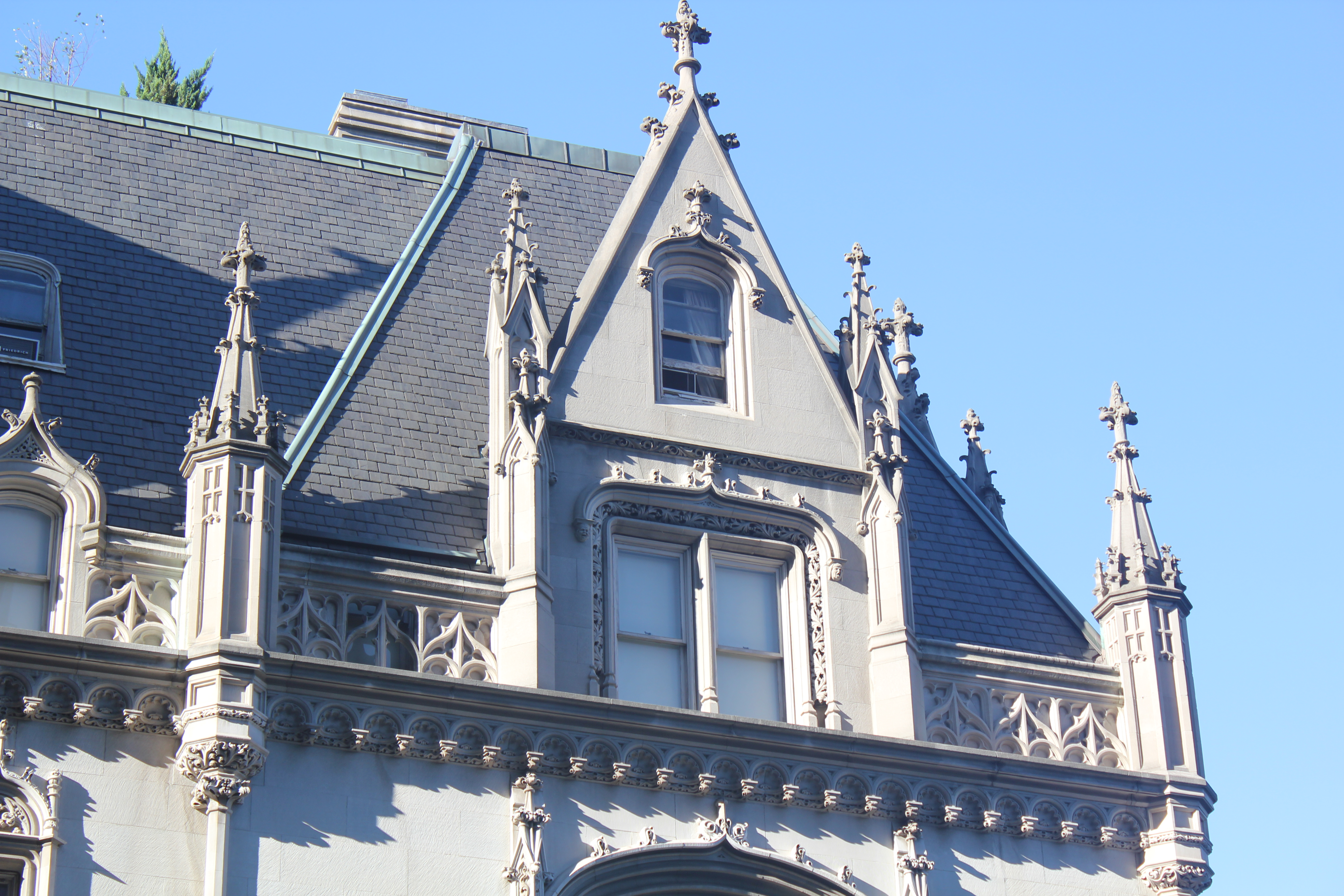
Detail of a triangular dormer on the roof

The executors of the Stuyvesant estate sold the Sinclair House in 1954 to a group of investors, who sold it in 1955 to the Ukrainian Institute of America (UIA), a nonprofit founded by Ukrainian businessman William Dzus in 1948 to promote Ukrainian culture. The UIA's purchase of the Sinclair House gave the structure a "temporary reprieve" from demolition, as described by Newsday; at the time, several other mansions on Fifth Avenue were being demolished. The mortgage on the building was repaid in 1962.

In 1977, the New York City Landmarks Preservation Commission designated the house as part of the Metropolitan Museum Historic District, a collection of 19th- and early 20th-century mansions around Fifth Avenue between 78th and 86th Streets. That June, the American Association for State and Local History filed paperwork with the National Park Service to nominate the Sinclair House for inclusion on the National Register of Historic Places (NRHP). The next year, on June 2, 1978, it was added to the NRHP.

The UIA began repair work on the roof of the Sinclair House in late 1996 at an estimated cost of $250,000 (equivalent to $513,208 in 2025). In an interview with The New York Times that year, a member of the board described this work as an interim measure, as the building was in a poor state. At the time, the UIA was spending an estimated $150,000 (equivalent to $307,925 in 2025) annually on upkeep. During the renovation, one-fourth of the slate tiles were replaced and some drainage systems around the dormers were replaced. In November 2003, the US government made a matched grant of $270,000 (equivalent to $472,549 in 2025) to the UIA through the Save America's Treasures initiative to cover the costs of modernizing the building's electrical wiring and plumbing. The state government's Office of Parks, Recreation and Historic Preservation granted the UIA another $70,000 (equivalent to $119,318 in 2025) for restoration in June 2004. Because these were matched grants, the UIA was required to raise $340,000 (equivalent to $579,545 in 2025) on its own before accepting them. By July 2009, the UIA had completed improvements to the electrical wiring, installed a security system, replaced windows, and restored design elements. The skylight above the central stairs was also restored.

== Architecture ==
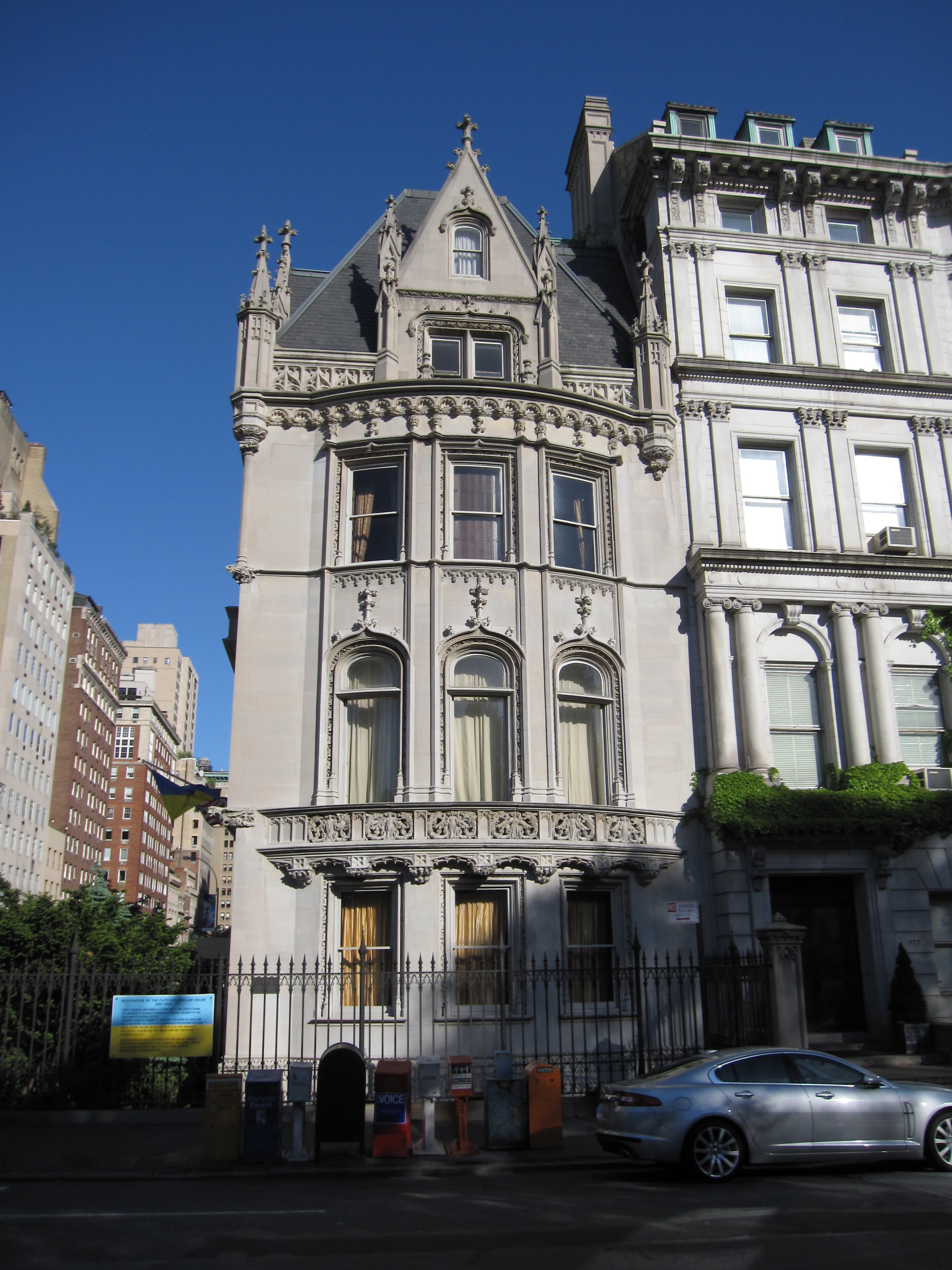
The west facade of the Sinclair House; 973 Fifth Avenue is at far right

The mansion was one of several ornate residences on the south side of 79th Street, which had been undeveloped until the end of the 19th century. It was designed in an eclectic French Renaissance style by C. P. H. Gilbert, who built several other mansions along Fifth Avenue. The foreman, Harvey Murdock, was also prolific both in the construction of private residences in Manhattan and Brooklyn, and had worked with Gilbert several times prior to the Sinclair House. The only additions to the building since its construction – a tankhouse on the roof and concrete arches to support a new roof for the penthouse – were made by Gilbert in the 1920s. The mansion has a height of about 71 feet (22 m). An areaway, or dry moat, surrounds the mansion.

=== Facade ===
Gilbert and Murdock constructed the bulk of the mansion with brick, which was then faced with limestone ashlar. The north facade is characterized by multiple windows, housed in either square recesses or semi-elliptical and fully Gothic arches, and adorned variously with colonettes, ogee arches, and foliate reliefs around the glass. The main entrance is a frontispiece, a staple of French Renaissance homes, placed just to the left of the facade's center. It is made up of a portal that contains six wrought iron and glass doors, all fashioned in the Gothic Revival style. Within the portal is a set of Renaissance Revival doors. On top of the portal is a balcony, in front of a second-story window in a rectangular recess embellished with hanging crockets. The balustrades flanking the entrance and the balcony above it are decorated with images of seahorses. A string course runs horizontally across the facade above the first story, and another string course runs above the second story. At the top of the facade are wall dormers, topped with pinnacles, upon a cornice that frames a mansard roof shingled in slate. At each corner on the cornice are small turrets ornamented with crockets and finials.

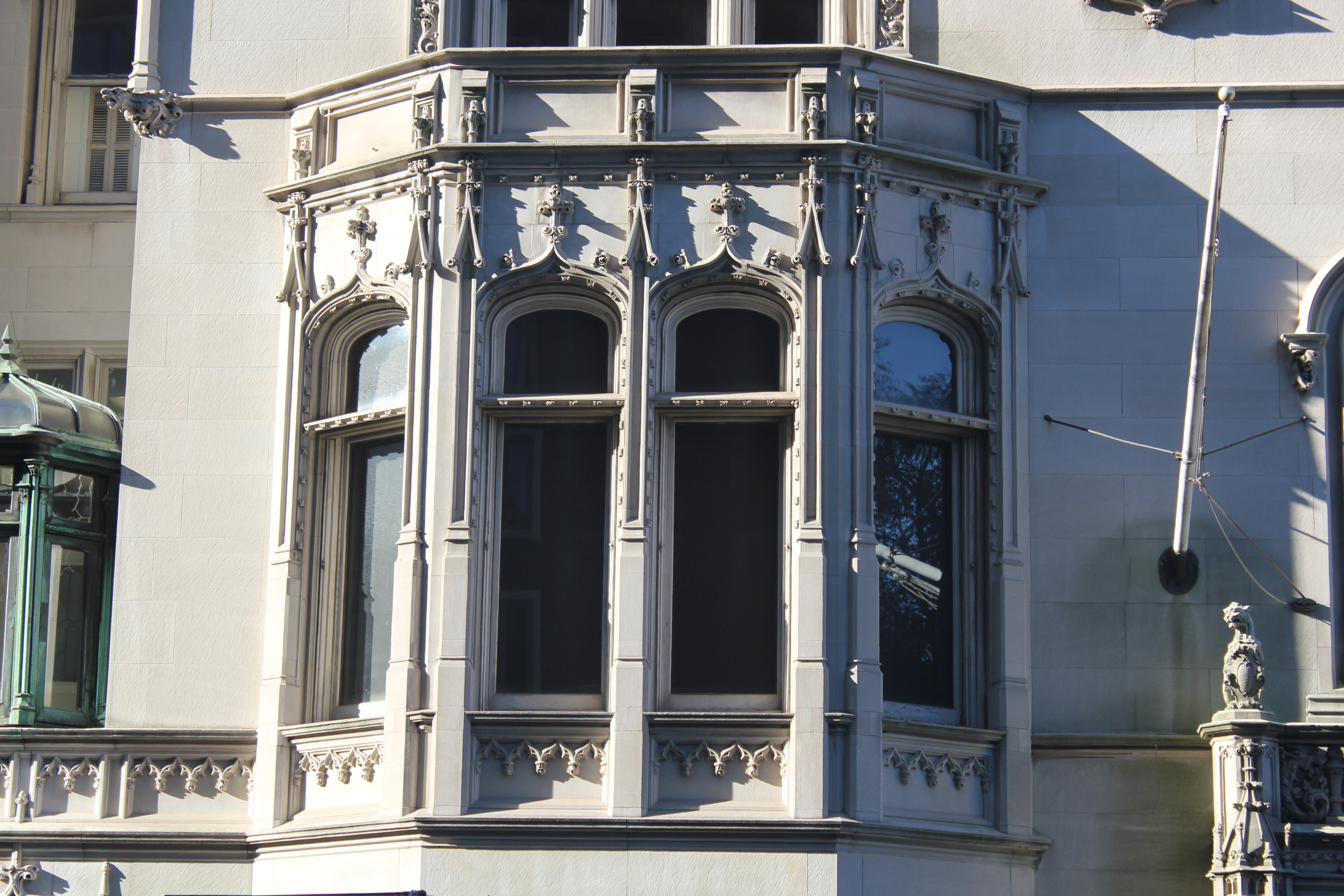
Detail of a window

To the left, or east, of the entrance is a three-sided bay window rising from the basement to the third floor. On the first and second stories, the bay window is divided into two window panes at the center and one smaller pane on either side. There are carved panels underneath the second-story windows, giving the impression of a false parapet. Further left of the bay window is a copper conservatory in a corner recess. There is a recessed service entrance at the first story, under the conservatory. The service entrance consists of an ogee arch, a transom window with finials, and a false parapet above the entrance (a continuation of the parapet below the bay window).

The western elevation of the facade is symmetrical and dominated by a curved, projecting pavilion, rising from the basement to the cornice. Every floor on the project has three windows, which again mix square frames and elliptical arches. Belt courses run along the entire facade, separating the floors and terminating at the corners with sculpted gargoyle heads.

=== Interior ===
The interior of the Sinclair House comprises 27 rooms on six floors, for a total floor area of 20,000 square feet (1,900 m^{2}). The first three floors retain their original appearance, but not their original furnishings. At the center of the first floor is a reception hall or lobby which measures 33 by 16 feet (10.1 by 4.9 m) across. There are two bathrooms next to the lobby The reception hall separates the main entrance from the main staircase, the latter of which occupies the south wall. The grand staircase is designed in the Francis I style. Also on the first floor was a kitchen, a smaller and more enclosed staircase, and a pantry. Gilbert also added an elevator because, as he reasoned, a lift was a useful amenity within any house that cost more than $25,000. After the Ukrainian Institute took over the house, the westernmost room became a board room measuring 29 by 25 feet (8.8 by 7.6 m). The eastern part of the house is used as a coat room, an office, and a service entrance leading to the secondary stairway.

The second floor is delineated into a ballroom and a dining hall. The ballroom (also the drawing room) occupied the western half of the house, and the dining room occupied the eastern half. (Note: Tauranac 1985, p. 181, describes these rooms as being on the first floor, using European floor numbering, while Ukrainian Institute of America, p. 3, refers to these spaces as being on the second floor, using American floor numbering.) The pantry connected with the dining room, and there was originally a dumbwaiter leading from the pantry to the basement. Although the second floor had three sinks for the service staff, it had no restroom for visitors when the mansion was used as a residence. After the Ukrainian Institute acquired the house, the western room became the concert hall, measuring 42 by 28 feet (12.8 by 8.5 m) across, and the eastern room became the chandelier room, measuring 23 by 27 feet (7.0 by 8.2 m) across. The pantry and a conservatory abut the chandelier's room. A stair landing measuring 22 by 15 feet (6.7 by 4.6 m) connects the concert hall and chandelier rooms.

The third floor has a library, master bedroom (originally Fletcher's wife's room), and a dressing room. These spaces are connected by a hallway running through the southern half of the house, which also connects with the stairs. The library is located at the western end of the house, and there is an oval music room at the center. The library measures 31 by 29 feet (9.4 by 8.8 m) across and is accessed via an entryway leading to the central hallway. To the northeast of the library is a small room used as a bar, which in turn leads to the oval room. The oval room measures 23 by 13 feet (7.0 by 4.0 m) across and occupies the center of the northern half of the third floor. Mrs. Fletcher's room was the easternmost room. The east room measures 23 by 20 feet (7.0 by 6.1 m) across and connects with a bathroom.

The fourth floor was formerly occupied by Fletcher's bedroom and guest rooms. There was also a den overlooking Central Park, as well as a sewing room, on that story. The fourth story is exhibit space but still contains two original marble bathtubs. The top two floors, within the mansard roof, have been transformed from servants' quarters into office space for the UIA's staff.

== Reception ==
An 1899 article in the Real Estate Record and Guide generally praised the composition of the Sinclair House but noted that it had a rather ecclesiastical appearance and did not much resemble other, then-contemporary New York manors. Two years later, however, the same magazine characterized the house as being part of "the two best-developed blocks on upper Fifth Avenue", namely between 77th and 79th Streets, and by 1918 the magazine described the house as "one of the finest on the avenue".

John Strausbaugh, writing for The New York Times in 2007, described the Sinclair House as a "fairy-tale palace". The 2010 AIA Guide to New York City characterized the house as "a miniature French-Gothic chateau squeezed into the urban context". Architectural historian Andrew Dolkart said of the Sinclair House in 2020, "The corner chateau, for example, both fits in and stands out." He praised the "whimsical details", including what he described as "the carved dragon fish in the railings and those figures in funny hats holding up the windows". In 2026, a writer for the Times called the building "a fine amalgam of past and present".

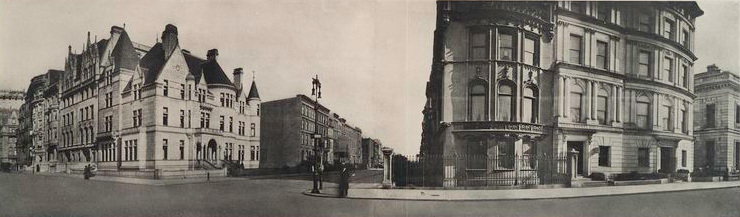
Intersection of Fifth Avenue and 79th Street in 1911

== See also ==
- List of National Historic Landmarks in New York City
- National Register of Historic Places listings in Manhattan from 59th to 110th Streets
