= Isaac Dudley Fletcher =

American businessman, art collector and museum benefactor (1844–1917)

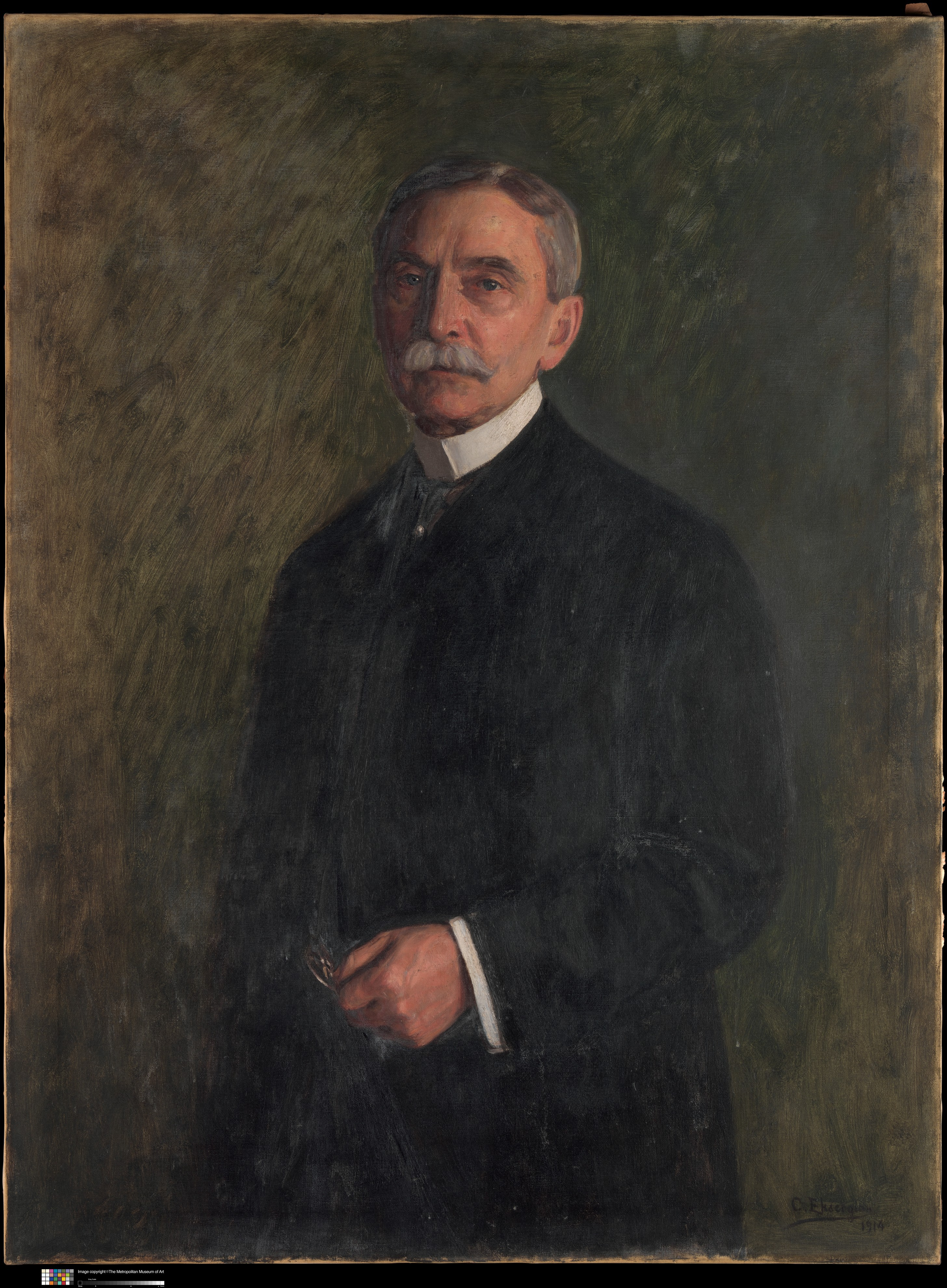
- Portrait by Carnig Eksergian
- Born: Isaac Dudley Fletcher; May 13, 1844; Bangor, Maine, U.S.
- Died: April 28, 1917 (aged 72); New York, New York, U.S.
- Occupations: Industrialist, philanthropist, museum benefactor
- Spouse: Marie Elizabeth Pickering (m. 1864; died 1914)
- Children: 1

Isaac Dudley Fletcher (May 13, 1844 – April 28, 1917) was an American businessman, art collector and museum benefactor.

Native of Bangor, Maine, he settled in New York in 1865 and was a member of the Lotos and Union League clubs.

He had the mansion built that is called today the Harry F. Sinclair House. He was president of Barrett Manufacturing Company which distributed asphalt and acquired a large art collection which he bequeathed to the Metropolitan Museum of Art.

According to the Frick library, he owned work by "David, Gainsborough, Rembrandt, Reynolds, and Rubens, Alexander H Wyant, Corot and Daubigny". The "work by David" referred to the Portrait of Charlotte du Val d'Ognes, which at the time of the bequest in 1917 was still attributed to Jacques-Louis David, but since 1995 has been attributed to Marie-Denise Villers.

Besides the collection itself, the bequest included a large sum of money to start a fund for the purchase of art. According to the 1994 Museum guidebook, several of the paintings listed were purchased through the Fletcher Fund, most notably the Portrait of Juan de Pareja.

== Some objects in 1917 bequest ==
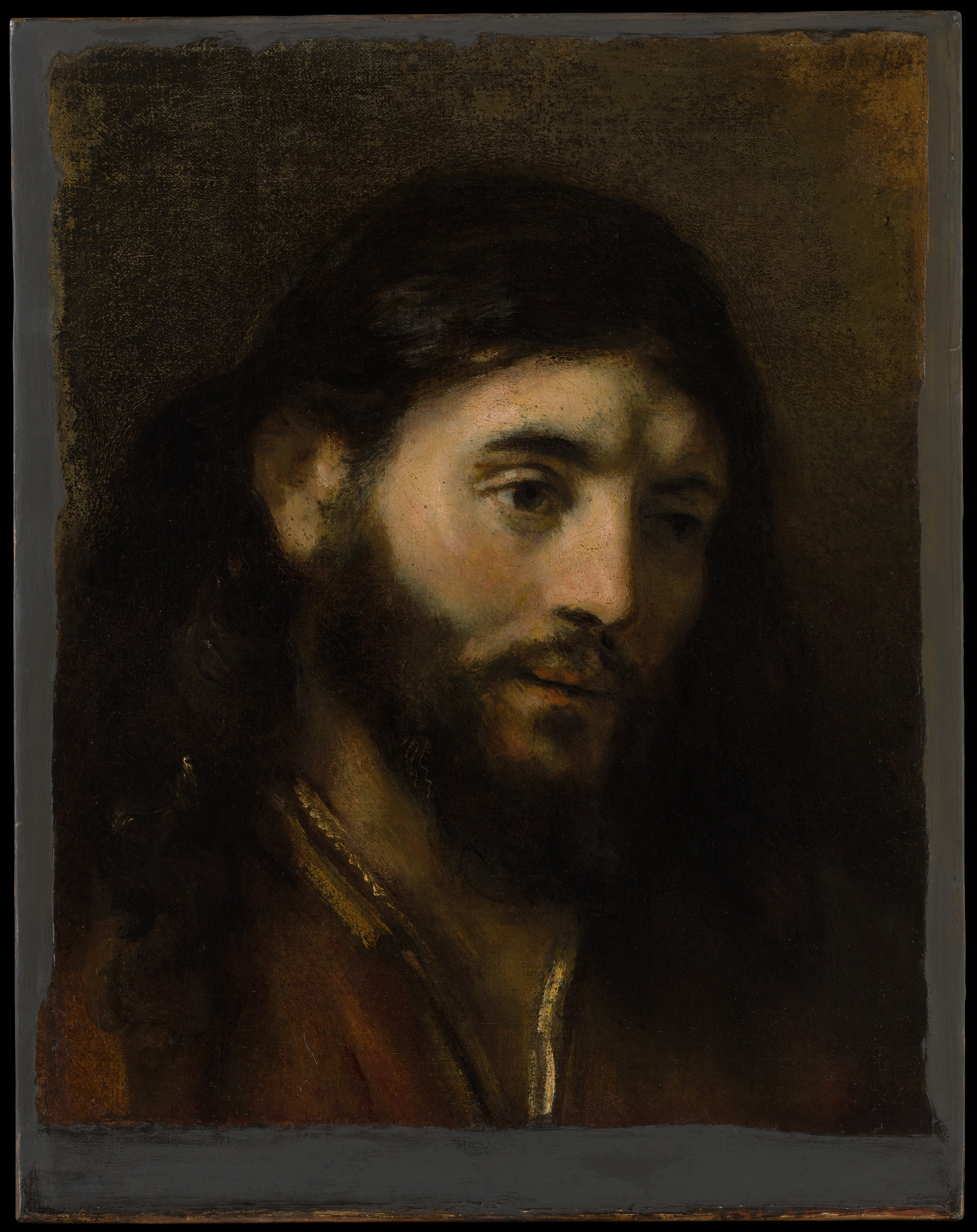
Head of Christ

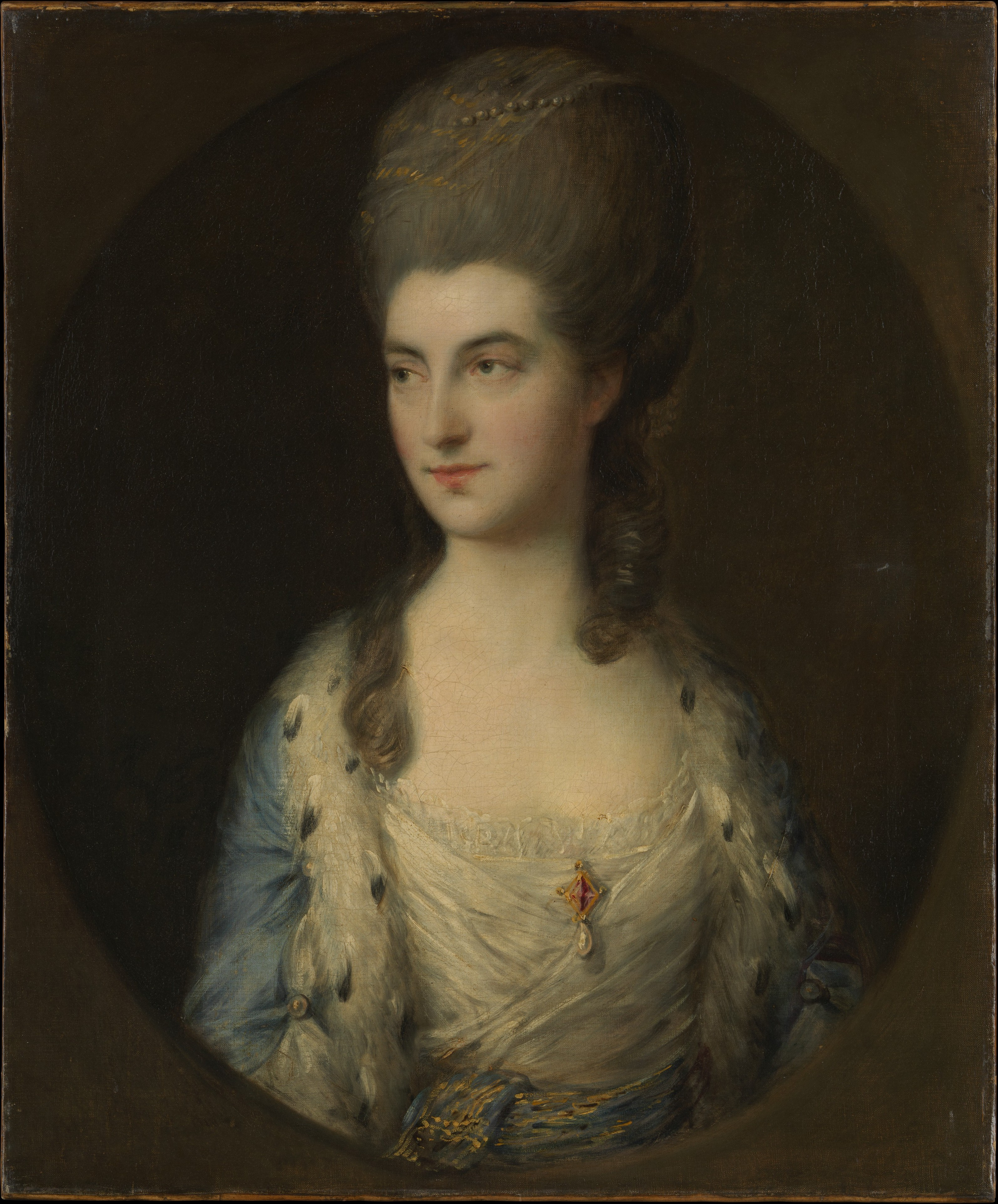
Portrait of a Young Woman, Called Miss Sparrow

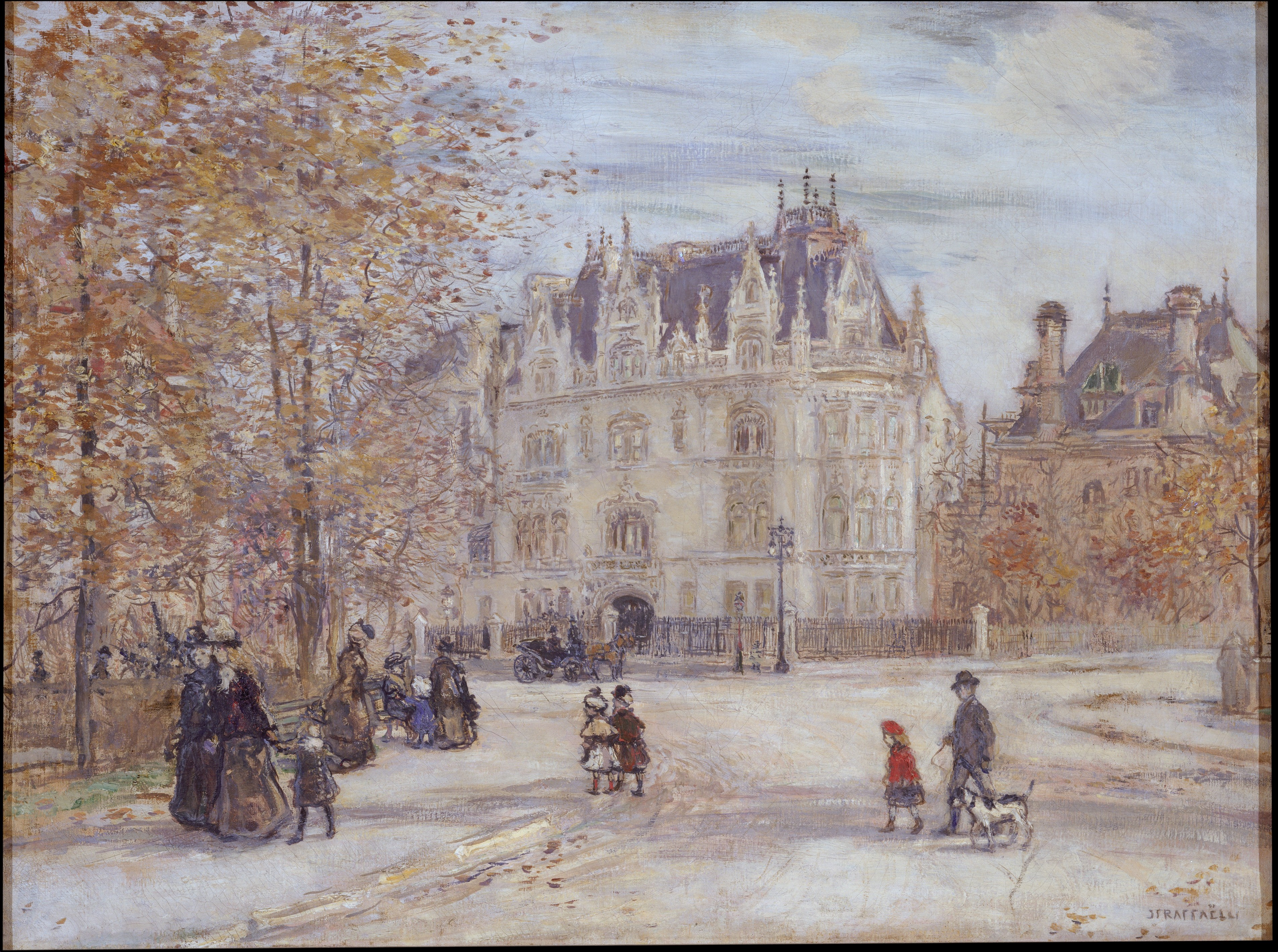
The Fletcher Mansion

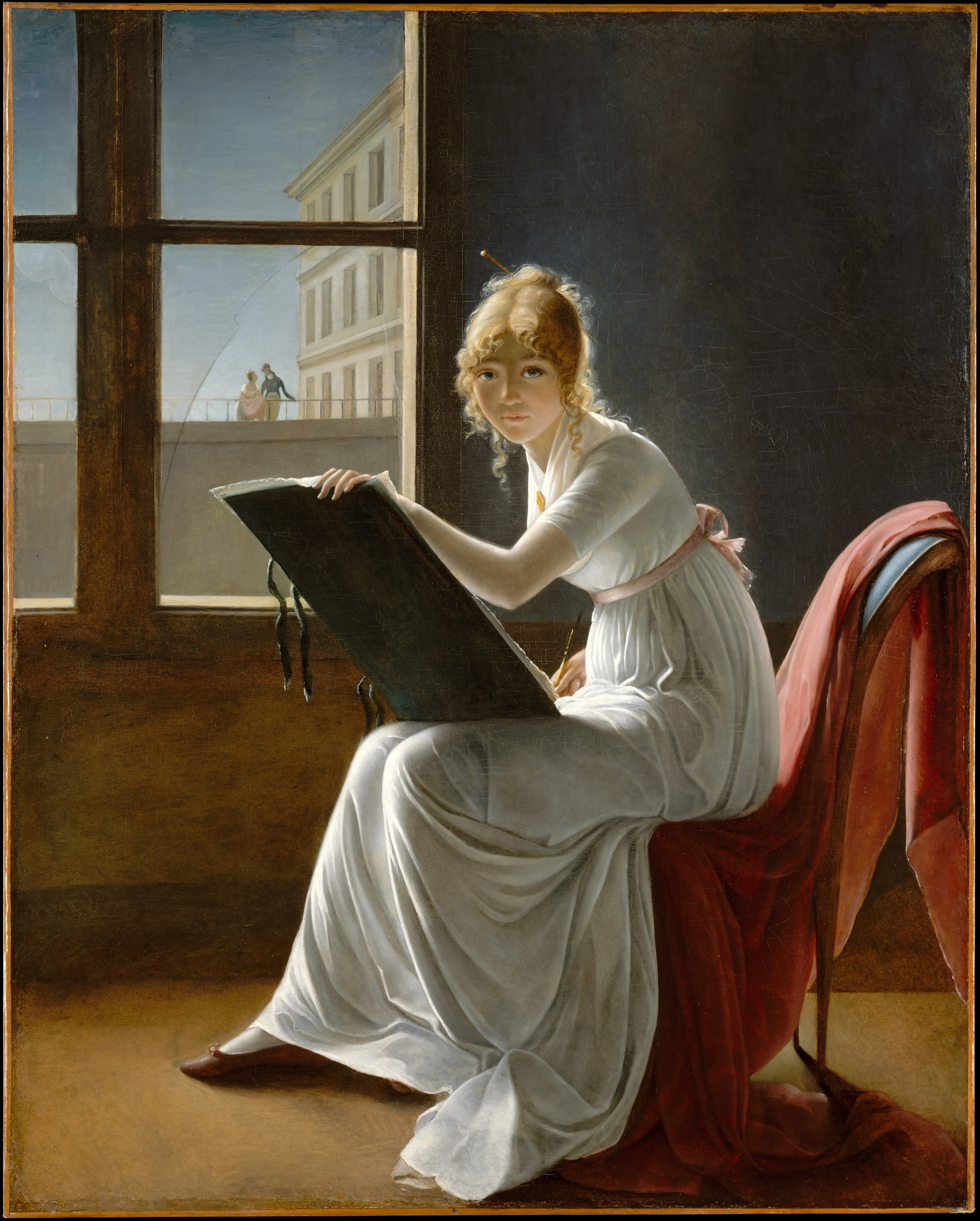
Portrait of Charlotte du Val d'Ognes

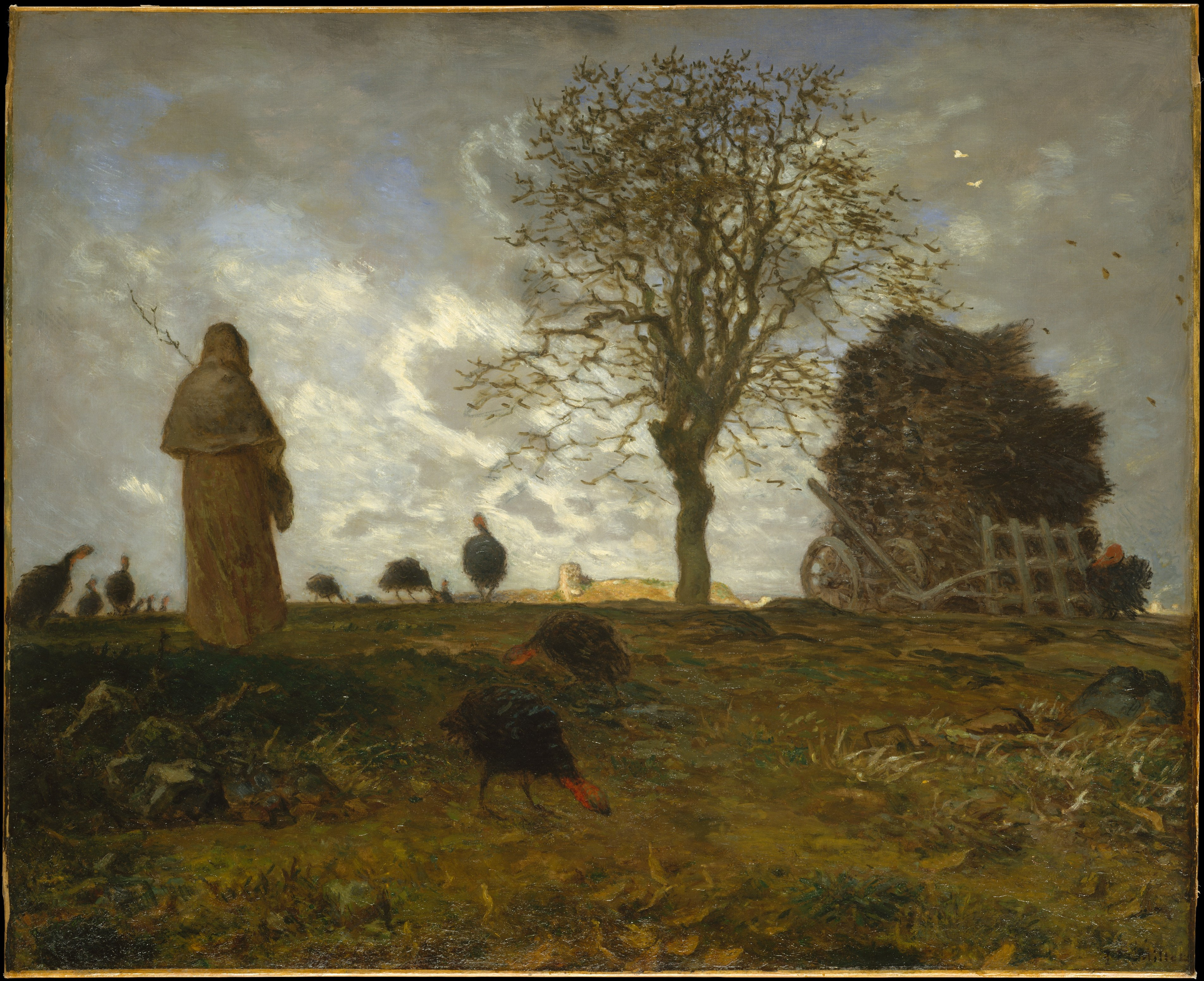
Autumn Landscape with a Flock of Turkeys

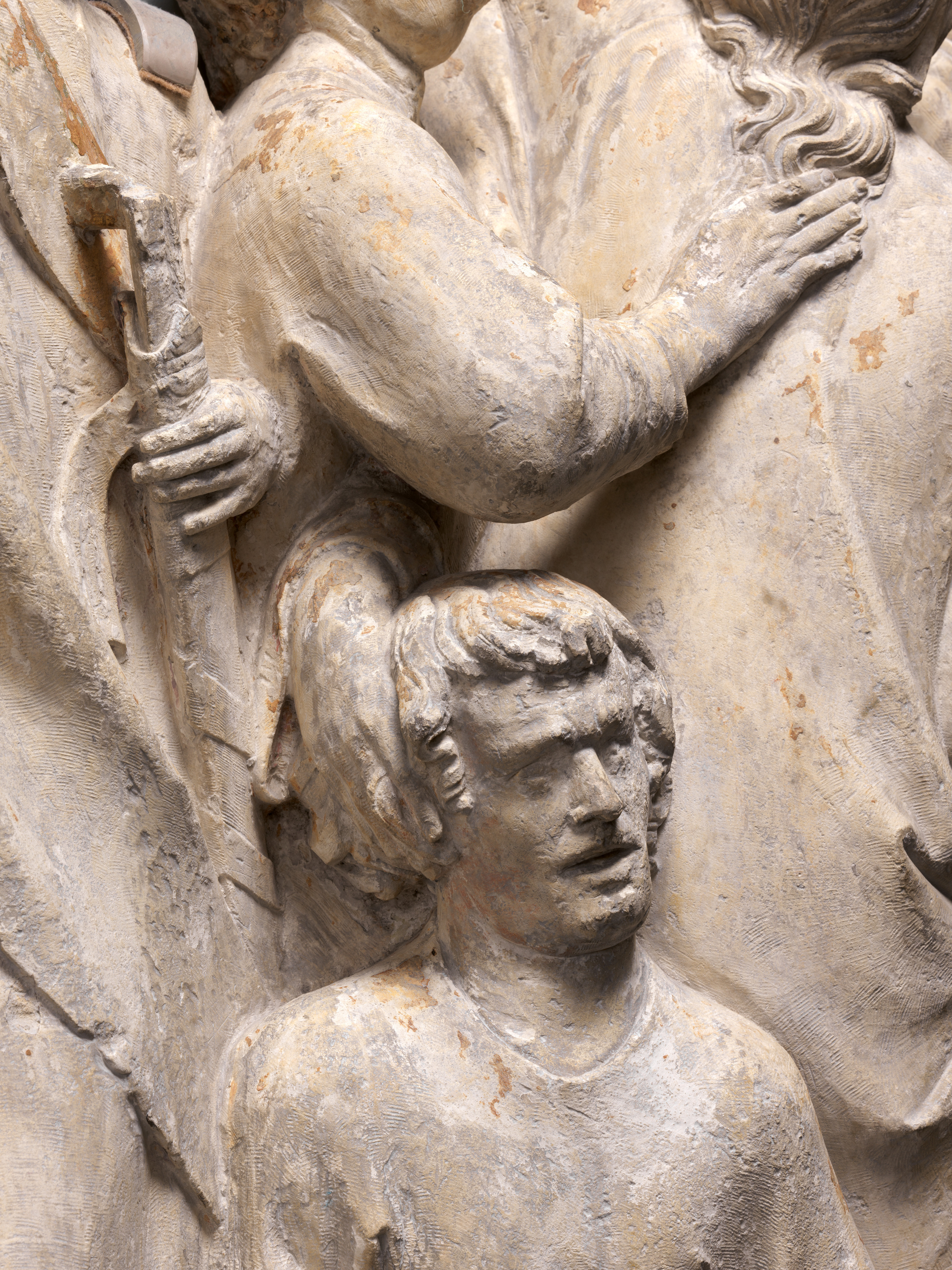
Relief of the Betrayal and Arrest of Jesus

== Some objects purchased through the Fletcher Fund ==
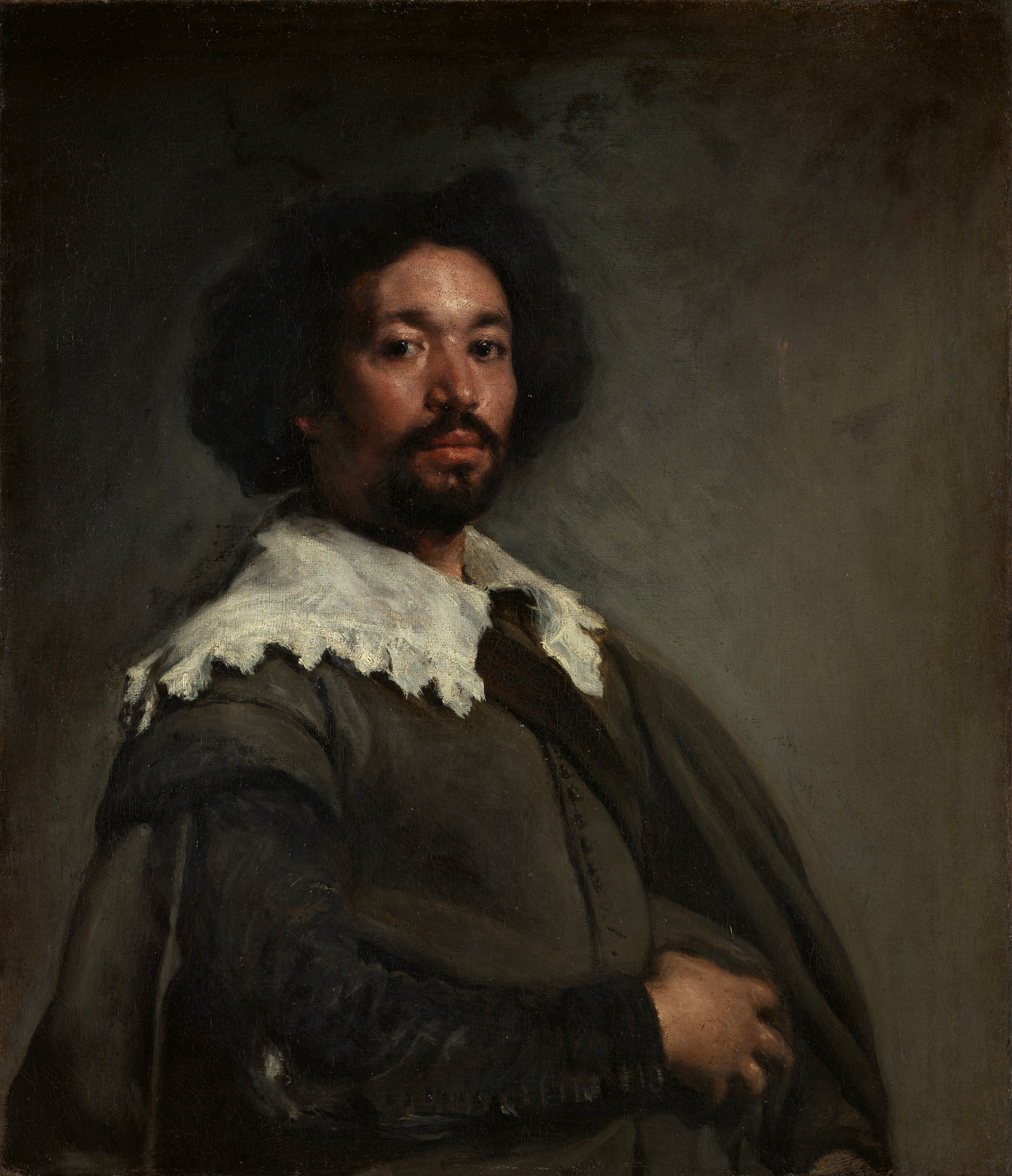
Portrait of Juan de Pareja

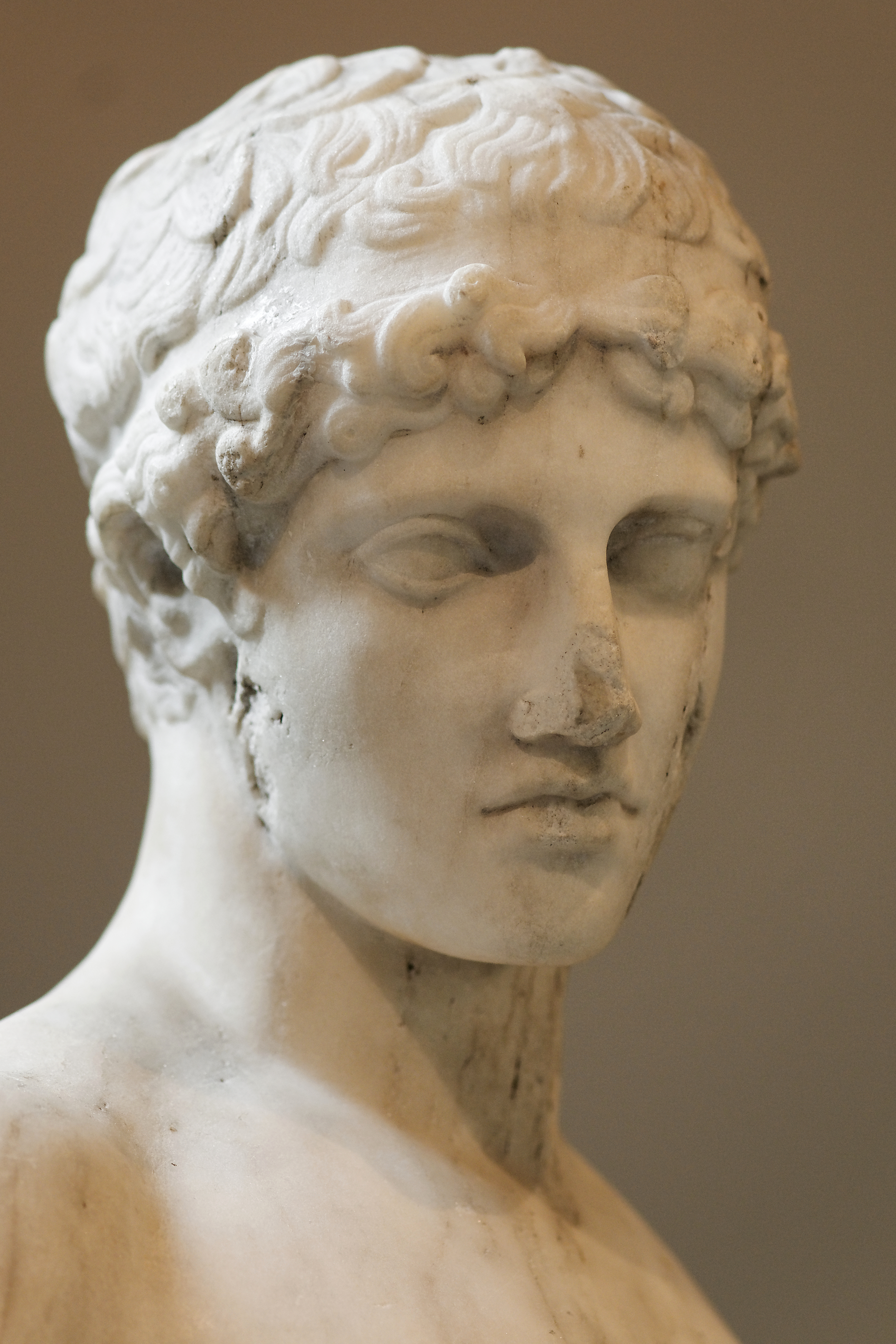
Youth

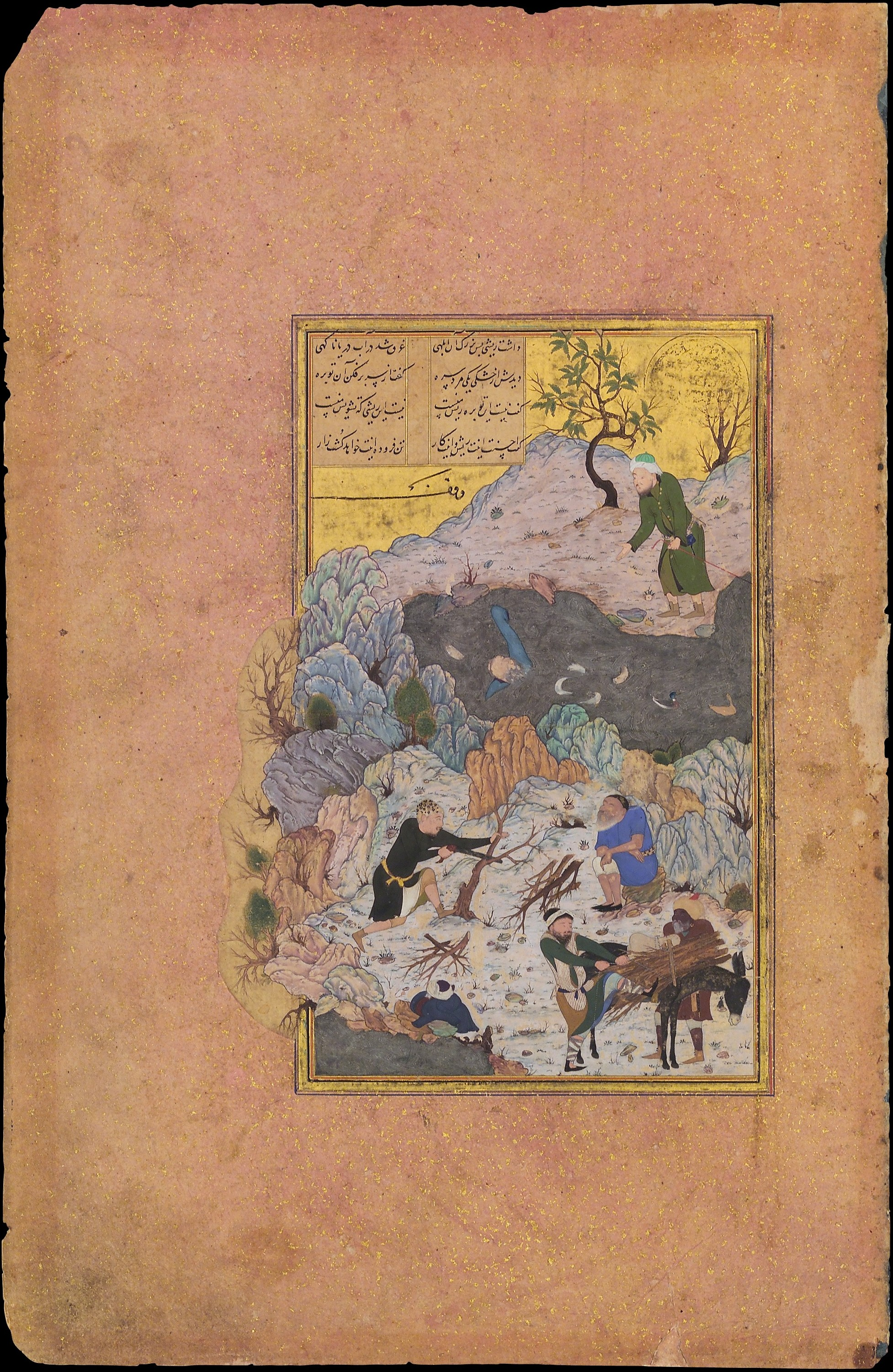
The Anecdote of the Man Who Fell into the Water

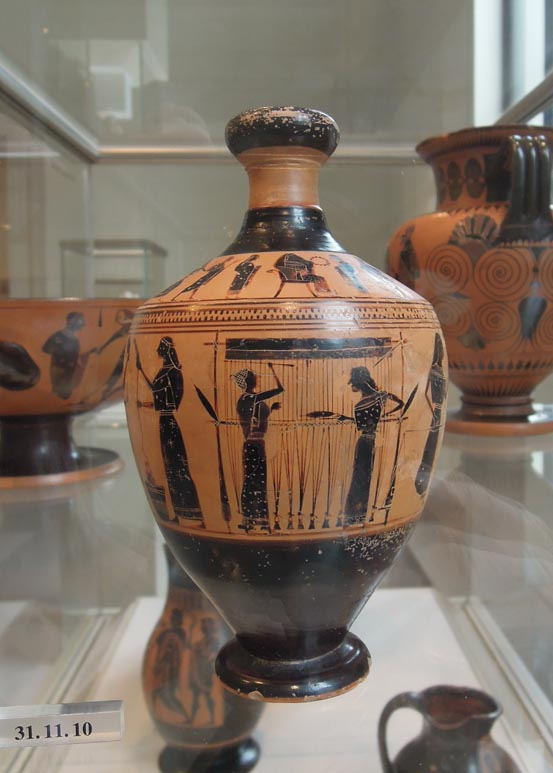
Weaving Vase
