= Girls Cutting Their Locks =

Ukrainian 2020 non-fiction book

Girls Cutting Their Locks is a 2020 Ukrainian non-fiction book by Yegeniya Podobna. This English text was translated from the Ukrainian by Mariia Kovalenko and published by the Ukrainian Institute of National Memory and Luta Sprava Publishing.

It comprises accounts by 25 women of their experiences in Ukrainian military service from 2014 to 2018, illustrated with photographs.

The book formed part of the input, along with six filmed accounts, for a paper "Ukraine's "Invisible Battalion": Perceptions and Treatment of Gender in the Donbas War" in the Journal of Veterans Studies, and was also studied for the paper "The Auto/biographical Nature of Ukrainian Women's Literature on the War in Donbas", published in Czytanie Literatury.
