= American Exorcist: Critical Essays on William Peter Blatty =

2008 anthology book

- Trade Paperback
- Author: Benjamin Szumskyj
- Cover artist: McFarland Publishing
- Language: English
- Genre: Non-fiction
- Publisher: McFarland Publishing
- Publication date: 2008
- Publication place: United States
- Media type: Print (Paperback)
- Pages: 204
- ISBN: 978-0-7864-3597-5
- OCLC: 228608101
- Dewey Decimal: 813/.54 22
- LC Class: PS3552.L392 Z55 2008

American Exorcist: Critical Essays on William Peter Blatty (2008) is an anthology of essays studying all of William Peter Blatty's novels, from Which Way to Mecca, Jack? (1959) to Elsewhere (2009).

== Contents ==
- "So Much Mystery...": The Fiction of William Peter Blatty by Scott D. Briggs
- Lebanon, the Fightin' Irish, and Billy Shakespeare: The Comic Novels of William Peter Blatty by John Goodrich
- Fear of the Assimilation of the Foreign Other in The Exorcist by Philip L. Simpson
- A Devil for the Day: William Peter Blatty, Ira Levin, and the Revision of the Satanic by John Langan
- The Horror of The Exorcist: Its Presentation and Confrontation by J. W. Ocker
- Some Thoughts on The Ninth Configuration by Henrik Sandbeck Harksen
- Twinkle, Twinkle, "Killer" Kane! and The Ninth Configuration: A Comparison by Ryan Streat
- "Foot, You Are Wise!": The Apologetic Structure of The Ninth Configuration by Geoffrey Reiter
- The Exorcist and Legion: Religious Horrors by Tim Kroenert
- The Devilish God: William Peter Blatty's Legion and the Problem of Evil by James Doig
- Demons Five, Exorcists Nothing: A Fable: The Theo-Illogical, Semi-Autobiographical Epic Film That Never Was by Michael Garrett
- It Ain't Over Till the Fat Lady Sings: William Peter Blatty's Elsewhere and the Haunted House Formula by Davide Mana
- The Exegesis of William Peter Blatty: Catholicism, Exorcism & Pazuzu by Benjamin Szumskyj
