= Ed Flanders =

American actor (1934–1995)

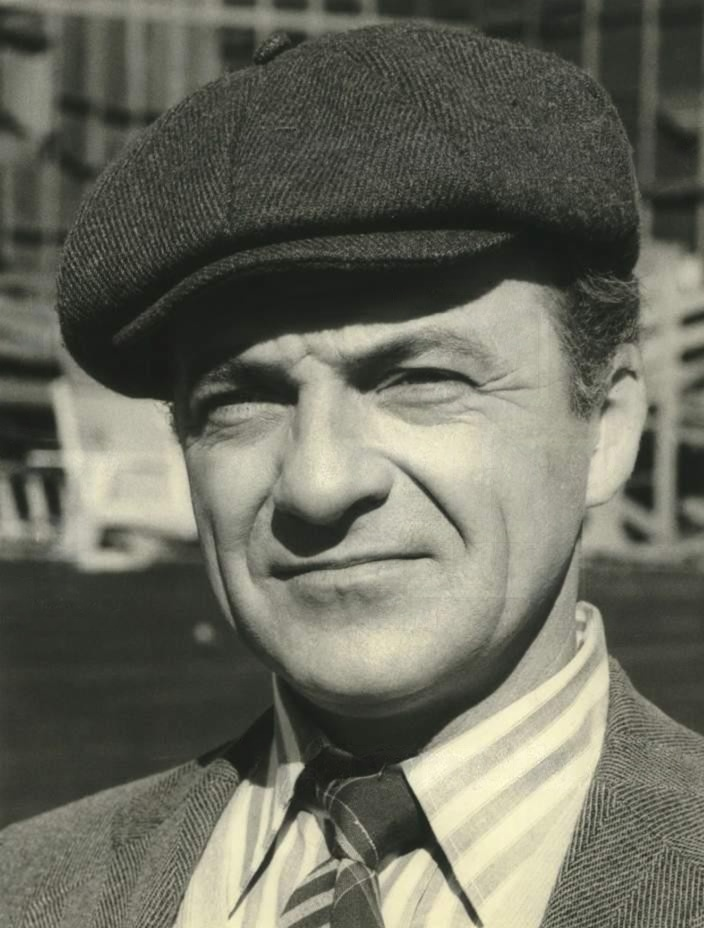
- Flanders as Noah Dietrich in The Amazing Howard Hughes (1977)
- Born: Edward Paul Flanders; December 29, 1934; Minneapolis, Minnesota, U.S.
- Died: February 22, 1995 (aged 60); Denny, California, U.S.
- Occupation: Actor
- Years active: 1967–1995
- Spouses: Bennye Kelly (m. 1954; div. 1959) Ellen Geer (m. 1963; div. 1968) Cody Lambert (m. 1985; div. 1992)
- Children: 4

Edward Paul Flanders (December 29, 1934 – February 22, 1995) was an American actor. He is best known for playing Dr. Donald Westphall in the medical drama series St. Elsewhere (1982–1988). Flanders was nominated for eight Primetime Emmy Awards and won three times in 1976, 1977, and 1983.

He received a Tony Award and a Drama Desk Award for his performance in the 1973 production of A Moon for the Misbegotten.

== Early life ==
Ed Flanders was born in Minneapolis, Minnesota, the son of Bernice (née Brown) and Francis Michael Grey Flanders. His mother was killed in an automobile crash when he was 14.

After graduating from Camden High School (Note: formerly called Henry High School) in Minneapolis (where he played hockey) in 1952, Flanders enlisted in the United States Army, where he worked as an X-ray technician.

== Early career ==
After his service with the United States Army ended, Flanders began his acting career on Broadway before moving on to guest parts in television series. From 1967 through 1975, Flanders appeared in more than a dozen American TV shows, including six appearances on Hawaii Five-O (as five different characters). During this time, he was also prolific in TV movies. He married actress Ellen Geer, with whom he had a son, Ian Geer Flanders (born 1966), before they divorced.

In the late 1970s, Flanders moved away from small TV roles to take major credits in both TV and feature films, while continuing his stage career. In 1974, Flanders won a Tony Award for Best Supporting or Featured Actor in a Dramatic Presentation for A Moon for the Misbegotten by Eugene O'Neill on Broadway. In 1975 Ed Flanders played in an episode of The Mary Tyler Moore Show as Fr. Terrance Brian. He also won an Emmy award in 1976 for the TV movie adaptation of A Moon for the Misbegotten.

== St. Elsewhere ==
In 1982, Flanders began playing the part of the greatly esteemed senior Dr. Donald Westphall in St. Elsewhere. This was a role that earned him five Emmy Award nominations as Outstanding Lead Actor in a TV Series, winning the award in 1983. After a stormy departure from the series in 1987, he returned for two more episodes in 1988, including the series finale. During a scene in which Westphall addressed the staff, Flanders began speaking extemporaneously about the quality of art, which had to be edited for broadcast.

Although he later returned for guest appearances, Flanders' exit as a regular cast member on St. Elsewhere was titled "Moon for the Misbegotten", alluding to the play that had won him a Tony Award. The episode gained much publicity, as Dr. Westphall left the hospital after "mooning" his new boss, Dr. John Gideon, saying "You can kiss my ass, pal". Flanders continued his working relationship with executive producer Bruce Paltrow in the short-lived 1994 CBS series The Road Home.

== Other notable roles ==
In addition to his six-year role as Dr. Donald Westphall, Flanders is noted as the person who has portrayed U.S. President Harry Truman more times, and in more separate productions, than any other actor. He played the role of Truman at the end of World War II and during the Korean War in the Hallmark episode Harry S. Truman: Plain Speaking, and in the movies Truman at Potsdam and MacArthur. In MacArthur, Flanders had second billing to Gregory Peck's lead as General Douglas MacArthur.

In feature films, Flanders performed major roles in two dark movies based on novels by William Peter Blatty. In the first, The Ninth Configuration (1980), he plays Col. Richard Fell, a self-effacing medic at a secret U.S. Army psychiatric facility who assists Marine psychiatrist Col. Vincent Kane (Stacy Keach). The film was based on Blatty's 1978 novel of the same name, itself a reworking of his earlier, darkly satirical novel Twinkle, Twinkle, "Killer" Kane (1966). In 1990, Flanders played Father Dyer alongside star George C. Scott in Blatty's The Exorcist III based on the novel Legion.

Flanders appeared in the M*A*S*H first-season episode "Yankee Doodle Doctor", playing film director Lt. Duane William Bricker, who is making a documentary about M*A*S*H units and visits the 4077th. After Hawkeye and Trapper sabotage his effort, Bricker abandons the project and leaves.

Flanders played the journalist William Allen White in the 1977 made-for-TV movie Mary White. The movie was based on the famous eulogy that White wrote about his daughter following her death in a horseback-riding accident in 1922. Flanders also appeared in the 1979 made-for-TV horror-miniseries Salem's Lot as Dr. Bill Norton. He then played television news anchor John Woodley in the 1983 made-for-TV suspense drama Special Bulletin, about a group of anti-nuclear activists who threaten to detonate a nuclear weapon in Charleston, South Carolina.

== Personal life ==
Flanders was married three times: to Bennye Kelly, from 1954 to 1959; to actress Ellen Geer, from 1963 to 1968; and to Cody Lambert, from 1985 to 1992. He was the father to four children in total. His son with Ellen Geer, Ian Geer Flanders, who was born in 1966, was briefly a child actor.

=== Later life and death ===
After three divorces, chronic pain from a back injury sustained in an automobile crash in Salyer, California, on September 26, 1988, and lifelong depression, Flanders died from a self-inflicted gunshot wound on February 22, 1995, in Denny, California, at the age of 60. No suicide note was found, and his remains were cremated.

== Filmography ==
=== Television ===
- 1967: Cimarron Strip (episode: "The Roarer") as Arliss Blynn
- 1969: Daniel Boone (episode: "The Traitor") as Lackland
- 1969: Hawaii Five-O (episode: "Up Tight") as Professor David Stone
- 1970: Hawaii Five-O (episode: "Three Dead Cows At Makapu") as Dr. Alexander Kline
- 1971: The Name of the Game (episode: "Beware of the Watchdog") as Lazlo Subich
- 1971: Travis Logan D.A. as Psychiatrist
- 1971: Bearcats! (episode: "The Hostage") as Ben Tillman
- 1971: Goodbye, Raggedy Ann (TV movie) as David Bevin
- 1971: McMillan & Wife (episode: "Husbands, Wives and Killers") as Tom Benton
- 1971: Mission Impossible (episode: "Blues") as Joe Belker
- 1972: Mannix (episode: "A Walk in the Shadows") as Tom Farnom
- 1972: Nichols a.k.a. James Garner as Nichols (episode: "Fight of the Century")
- 1972: Cade's County (episode: "The Fake") as Ben Crawford
- 1972: Ironside (episode: "Five days in the Death of Sgt. Brown: Part 1") as Phil McIver
- 1972: The Bold Ones: The New Doctors a.k.a. The New Doctors (episode: "Five Days in the Death of Sgt Brown: Part II") as Phil McIver
- 1972: M*A*S*H (episode: "Yankee Doodle Doctor") as Lt Dwayne Bricker
- 1972: Banyon (episode: "Just Once") as Sergeant Randall
- 1973: Kung Fu (episode: "The Salamander") as Alonzo Davis
- 1973: Marcus Welby, M.D. a.k.a. Robert Young, Family Doctor (episode: "The Comeback") as Magruder
- 1974: Barnaby Jones (episode: "Death on Deposit") as "Doc" Fred Tucker
- 1969–1975: Hawaii Five-O (6 episodes):
  - 1969 "Up Tight" as David Stone
  - 1970 "Three Dead Cows at Makapuu" (2-part episode) as Dr Alexander Kline
  - 1970 "The Guarnerius Caper" as Dmitri Rostov
  - 1972 "While You're at It, Bring in the Moon" as Byers
  - 1974 "One Born Every Minute" as Joe Connors
  - 1975 "And the Horse Jumped Over the Moon" as Bernie Ross
- 1975: The Mary Tyler Moore Show (episode: "Mary's Father") as Father Terrance Brian
- 1975: The Legend of Lizzie Borden as Hosea Knowlton
- 1975: Attack on Terror: The FBI vs. the Ku Klux Klan as Justice Department attorney Ralph Paine
- 1976: Hallmark Hall of Fame (episode: "Truman at Potsdam") as President Harry S Truman
- 1979: Backstairs at the White House (episodes 1.1, 1.2 and 1.4) as President Calvin Coolidge
- 1979: Blind Ambition (TV mini-series) as Charles Shaffer
- 1979: Salem's Lot a.k.a. Blood Thirst as Dr Bill Norton
- 1982–1988: St. Elsewhere - 120 episodes as Dr. Donald Westphall
- 1993: Jack's Place (episode: "Who Knew?") as Marcus Toback
- 1994: The Road Home (pilot episode) as William Babineaux

=== Films ===
- 1970: The Grasshopper or Passions or The Passing of Evil as Jack Benton
- 1972: The Trial of the Catonsville Nine as Father Daniel Berrigan
- 1972: The Snoop Sisters or The Female Instinct (TV Movie) as Milo Perkins
- 1973: Hunter (TV Movie) as Dr Miles
- 1974: Indict and Convict (TV Movie) as Timothy Fitzgerald
- 1974: Things in Their Season (TV Movie) as Carl Gerlach
- 1975: The Legend of Lizzie Borden (TV Movie) as Hosea Knowlton
- 1975: Attack on Terror: The FBI vs. the Ku Klux Klan (TV Movie) as Ralph Paine
- 1975: A Moon for the Misbegotten (TV Movie) as Phil Hogan
- 1976: Eleanor and Franklin (TV Movie) as Louis Howe
- 1976: The Sad and Lonely Sundays (TV Movie) as Dr Frankman
- 1976: Harry S. Truman: Plain Speaking (TV Movie) as President Harry S. Truman
- 1977: The Amazing Howard Hughes (TV Movie) as Noah Dietrich
- 1977: MacArthur as President Harry S. Truman
- 1977: Mary White (TV Movie) as William Allen White
- 1979: Salem's Lot as Dr. Bill Norton
- 1980: The Ninth Configuration or Twinkle, Twinkle, Killer Kane as Col. Richard Fell
- 1981: Inchon as President Harry S. Truman (voice, uncredited)
- 1981: True Confessions as Dan T. Campion
- 1981: The Pursuit of D.B. Cooper or Pursuit as Brigadier
- 1981: Skokie or Once They Marched Through a Thousand Towns (UK title) (TV Movie) as Mayor Albert J. Smith
- 1982: Tomorrow's Child (TV Movie) as Anders Stenslund
- 1983: Special Bulletin (TV Movie) as John Woodley
- 1989: The Final Days (TV Movie) as Leonard Garment
- 1990: The Exorcist III as Father Joseph Dyer
- 1991: The Perfect Tribute (TV Movie) as Warren
- 1992: Citizen Cohn (TV Movie) as Joseph N. Welch
- 1993: Message from Nam as Ed Wilson
- 1995: Bye Bye Love as Walter Sims (final film role)

== Awards and nominations ==
=== Television ===
Year	Award	Category	Nominated work	Result	Ref.
1976	Primetime Emmy Awards	Outstanding Single Performance by a Supporting Actor in a Comedy or Drama Special	A Moon for the Misbegotten	Won	
1977	Primetime Emmy Awards	Outstanding Lead Actor in a Drama or Comedy Special	Harry S. Truman: Plain Speaking	Won	
1979	Primetime Emmy Awards	Outstanding Supporting Actor in a Limited Series or a Special	Backstairs at the White House	Nominated	
1983	Primetime Emmy Awards	Outstanding Lead Actor in a Drama Series	St. Elsewhere	Won	
1984	Primetime Emmy Awards	Outstanding Lead Actor in a Drama Series	St. Elsewhere	Nominated	
1985	Primetime Emmy Awards	Outstanding Lead Actor in a Drama Series	St. Elsewhere	Nominated	
1986	Primetime Emmy Awards	Outstanding Lead Actor in a Drama Series	St. Elsewhere	Nominated	
1987	Primetime Emmy Awards	Outstanding Lead Actor in a Drama Series	St. Elsewhere	Nominated	

=== Theatre ===
Year	Award	Category	Nominated work	Result	Ref.
1974	Drama Desk Awards	Outstanding Performance	A Moon for the Misbegotten	Won	
1974	Tony Awards	Best Supporting or Featured Actor in a Play	A Moon for the Misbegotten	Won	
