= Elsewhere =

Elsewhere may refer to:

== Film ==
- Elsewhere (2001 film), a 2001 Austrian documentary by Nikolaus Geyrhalter
- Elsewhere (2009 film), an American thriller starring Anna Kendrick
- Elsewhere (2019 film), an American comedy-drama directed by Hernán Jiménez

== Literature ==
- Elsewhere, a 1991 novel by Will Shetterly
- Elsewhere (anthology), a 2003 Australian speculative-fiction anthology
- Elsewhere (Blatty novel), a 2009 novel by William Peter Blatty
- "Elsewhere" (short story), a 1941 science-fiction short story by Robert Heinlein
- Elsewhere (Zevin novel), a 2005 novel by Gabrielle Zevin
- Elsewhere: A Memoir, a 2012 memoir by novelist Richard Russo

== Music ==
- Elsewhere (Joe Morris album) or the title song, 1996
- Elsewhere (Pinegrove album), 2017
- Elsewhere (Scott Matthews album) or the title song, 2009
- Elsewhere (Set It Off album), 2022
- Elsewhere, an album by Ryan Hemsworth, 2019
- Elsewhere, an EP by Gretta Ray, 2016
- "Elsewhere", a song by Sarah McLachlan from Fumbling Towards Ecstasy, 1993

== Places ==
- Elsewhere, a museum and artist residency in Greensboro, North Carolina
- The name of a town in Calloway County, Kentucky
- Elsewhere (music venue), music venue in Bushwick, Brooklyn

== Other ==
- Elsewhere (website), a music, arts and travel website run by New Zealand journalist Graham Reid
- Elsewhere, the stage name of dancer David Bernal
- In special relativity, the region of spacetime outside a light cone
- Elsweyr, a fictional nation in the Elder Scrolls videogame series

== See also ==
- St. Elsewhere, an American television drama series
- St. Elsewhere (album), a 2006 album by Gnarls Barkley
- Dispatches from Elsewhere, a 2020 American television drama series
- Somewhere Else (disambiguation)
