= Edward Flanders =

Edward Flanders may refer to:

- Ed Flanders (1934–1995), American actor
- Ned Flanders, character in The Simpsons
