= Dimiter =

2010 novel by William Peter Blatty

- Trade hardcover
- Author: William Peter Blatty
- Language: English
- Genre: Suspense, Thriller, Horror
- Publisher: Forge Books
- Publication date: March 16, 2010
- Publication place: United States
- Media type: Print (Hardback)
- Pages: 304 (original hardcover)
- ISBN: 0-7653-2512-8
- OCLC: 428027110

Dimiter (also released under the title The Redemption in various parts of the world) is a novel by William Peter Blatty, released on March 16, 2010, through Forge Books. Publishers Weekly awarded Dimiter a starred review, calling it "a beautifully written, haunting tale of vengeance, spiritual searching, loss, and love".

== History ==
Dimiter had been in work since 1974, after Blatty read an article in William Friedkin's office, during the production of The Exorcist, concerning the execution of a priest in the former atheist state of Albania. The novel is dedicated to Blatty's late son, Peter Vincent Galahad Blatty.

== Feature film ==
According to Blatty, in his June 30, 2010 audio interview with "Authors on Tour", director William Friedkin was set out to make Dimiter a feature film, which would have marked this their first collaboration in almost 40 years. The two attempted to adapt Blatty's previous novel, Legion, into a feature film, but Friedkin later left that production over creative differences. Blatty went on to direct the picture himself. The two nonetheless remained friends, speaking frequently. In lieu of the publication of Dimiter, Friedkin interviewed Blatty for his blog in The Huffington Post, a few days after the author's announcement of a feature film on July 6, and compared the new novel with their previous collaboration:

Q. Do you think Dimiter measures up to The Exorcist, as a piece of writing?
A. Without a doubt, it's the best writing I've produced. I can't surpass it. I know that.

== Plot ==
The novel begins in Albania, where a spy named Paul Dimiter is tortured by the authorities. Revealed as an "agent from Hell", they try to get more from him, but before they know it, he escapes. The novel moves to Jerusalem one year later, where a half-Arab European policeman, Peter Meral, finds a murder victim who supposedly was from a mental hospital. Meral tries to find out if there is a connection between Jerusalem and Albania and the enigma of Dimiter.
