= Crazy (novel) =

2010 novel by William Peter Blatty

- Trade Hardcover
- Author: William Peter Blatty
- Language: English
- Genre: Mystery
- Publisher: Forge Books
- Publication date: November, 2010
- Publication place: United States
- Media type: Print (hardback)
- Pages: 208 (Original Hardcover)
- ISBN: 978-0-7653-2649-2

Crazy is a novel by William Peter Blatty, released in November 2010 through Forge Books.

As with Blatty's previous release, Dimiter, Crazy is available in both hardcover and audiobook formats.
