= I, Billy Shakespeare =

1965 novel by William Peter Blatty

- First edition
- Author: William Peter Blatty
- Language: English
- Genre: Satire, comedy
- Published: 1965
- Publisher: Doubleday
- Publication place: USA
- Pages: 89
- ISBN: 1135736391

I, Billy Shakespeare is a 1965 comedic book by William Peter Blatty.

== Synopsis ==
William Shakespeare's ghost angrily denounces suggestions that he did not write the works attributed to him.

== Reception ==
S. T. Joshi noted that the book "achieved little or no critical and commercial success". Kirkus Reviews considered it "abject" and lacking in plot, and observed that despite some "amusing truth(s)", Blatty "had no gift for epithets or spleen".
