= Somewhere Else =

Somewhere Else may refer to:

== Drama, literature, television, and film ==
- Somewhere Else (musical), 1913 Broadway musical
- Somewhere Else (novel), 2008 novel by Jan Guenther Braun
- "Somewhere Else" (The Good Place), an episode of the American comedy television series

== Music ==
=== Albums ===
- Somewhere Else (Lydia Loveless album), 2014
- Somewhere Else (Eva Avila album), 2006
- Somewhere Else (Marillion album), 2007
- Somewhere Else (Sun Ra album), 1993
- Somewhere Else (Barry Altschul album), 1979
- Somewhere Else (Sally Shapiro album), 2013
- Somewhere Else, an EP included with some copies of the Church's Sometime Anywhere album

=== Songs ===
- "Somewhere Else", a 1997 song by China Drum
- "Somewhere Else", a 2003 song by rock band Travis from their album 12 Memories
- "Somewhere Else" (Razorlight song), a 2005 song by Razorlight from their debut album, Up All Night
- "Somewhere Else", a 2008 song by VenetianPrincess
- "Somewhere Else" (Toby Keith song), the third and final single by Toby Keith from his 2010 album Bullets in the Gun, released in 2011

== See also ==
- Elsewhere (disambiguation)
