= 38th Golden Globe Awards =

Film award ceremony in 1981

- Date: January 31, 1981
- Site: Beverly Hilton Hotel; Beverly Hills, Los Angeles, California

Highlights
- Best Film: Drama: Ordinary People
- Best Film: Musical or Comedy: Coal Miner's Daughter
- Best Drama Series: Shōgun
- Best Musical or Comedy Series: Taxi
- Most awards: (5) Ordinary People
- Most nominations: (8) Ordinary People

The 38th Golden Globe Awards, honoring the best in film and television for 1980, were held on January 31, 1981. The awards were presented by the Hollywood Foreign Press Association and broadcast on CBS.

== Winners and nominees ==
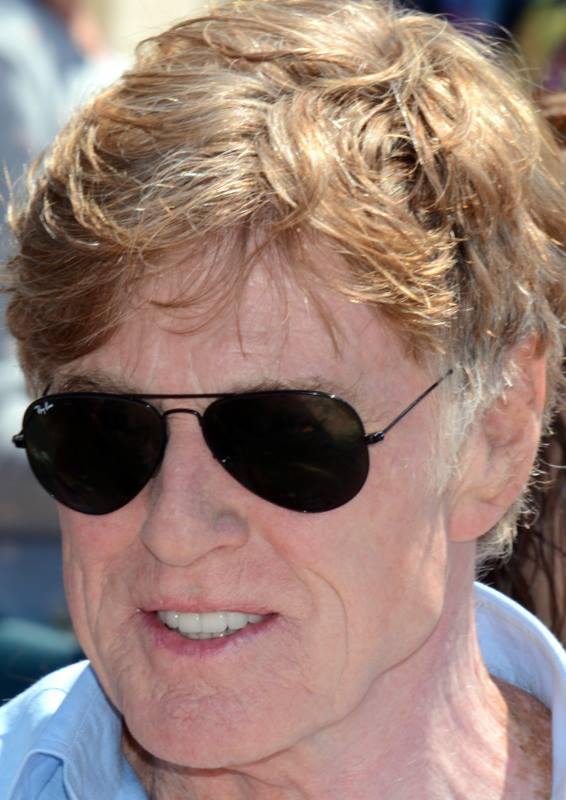
Robert Redford — Best Director, winner

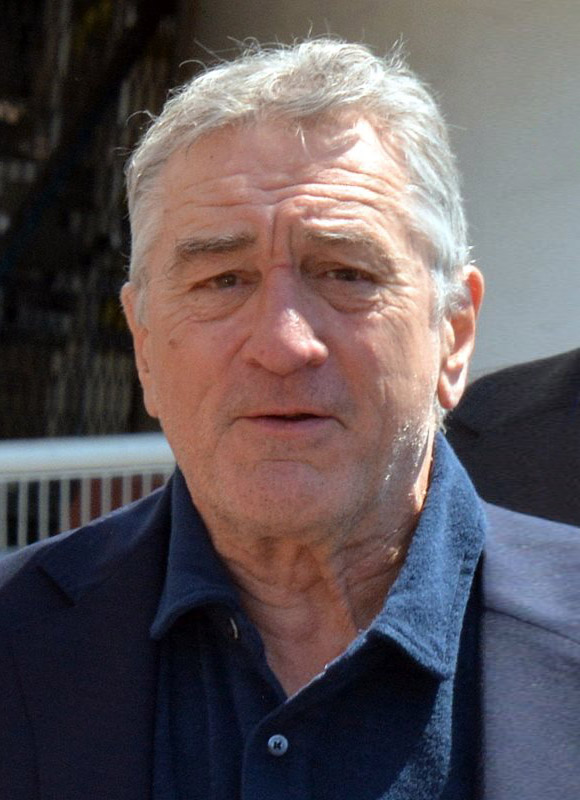
Robert De Niro — Best Actor in a Motion Picture, Drama winner

Mary Tyler Moore — Best Actress in a Motion Picture, Drama winner

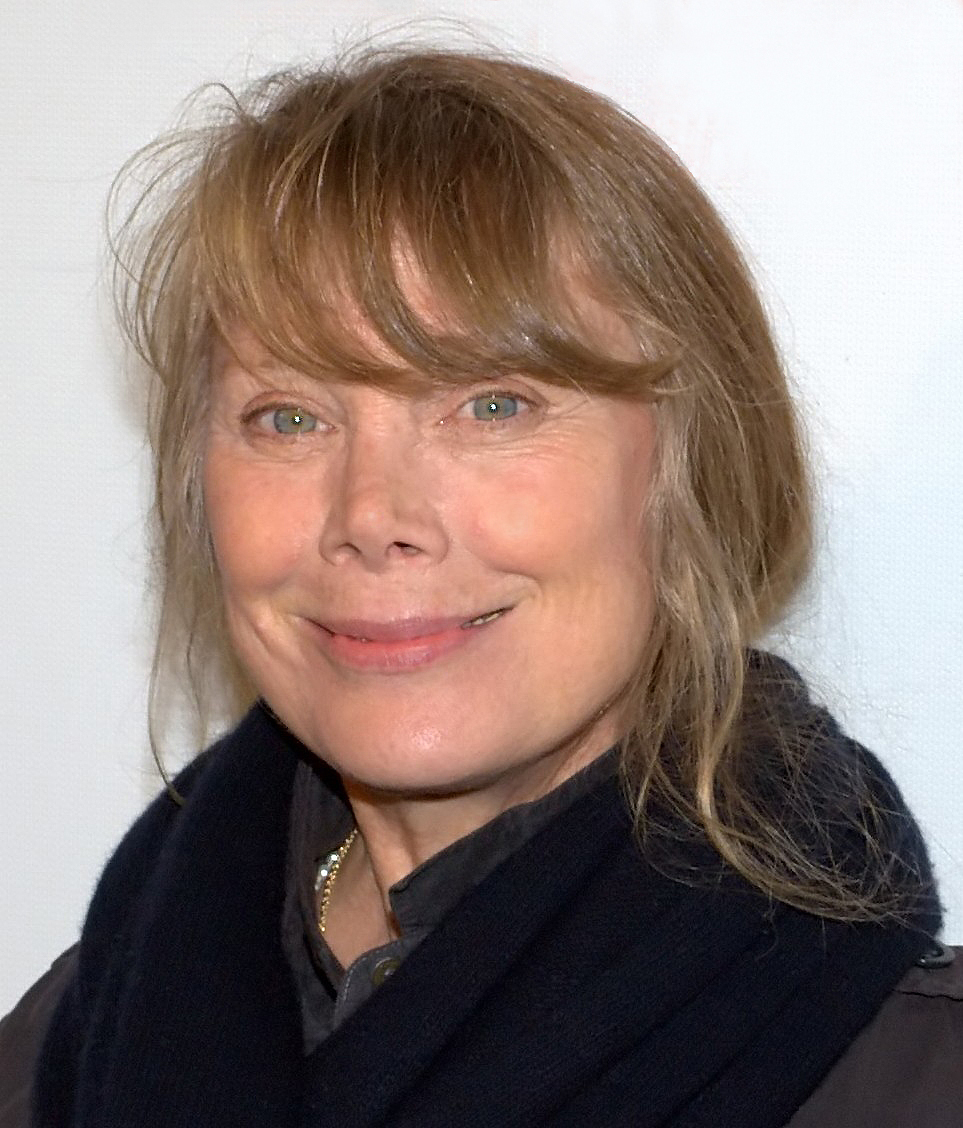
Sissy Spacek — Best Actress in a Motion Picture, Comedy or Musical winner

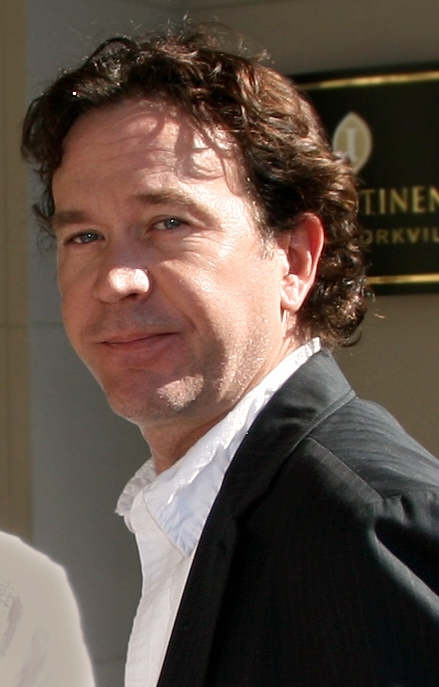
Timothy Hutton — Best Supporting Actor in a Motion Picture, winner

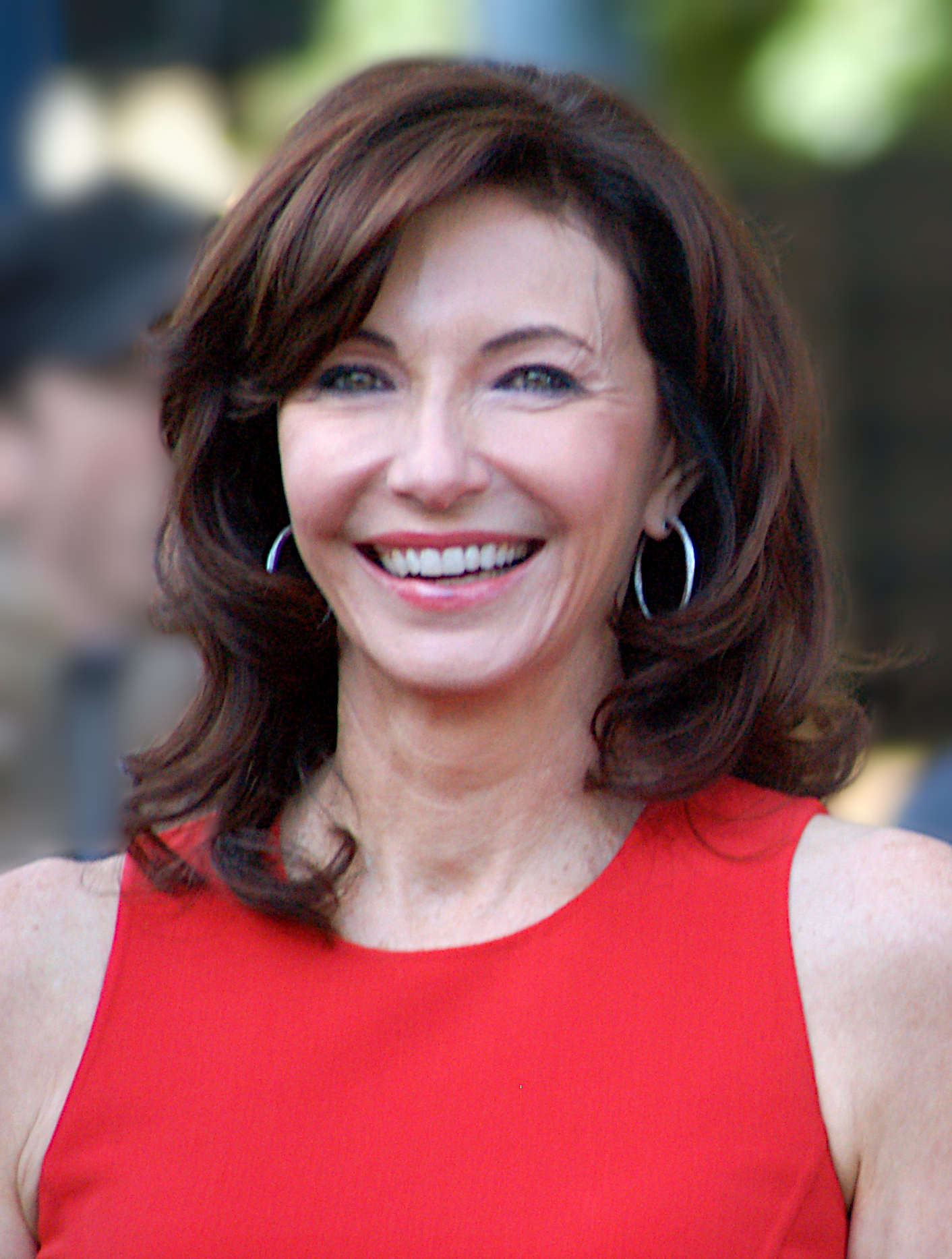
Mary Steenburgen — Best Supporting Actress in a Motion Picture, winner

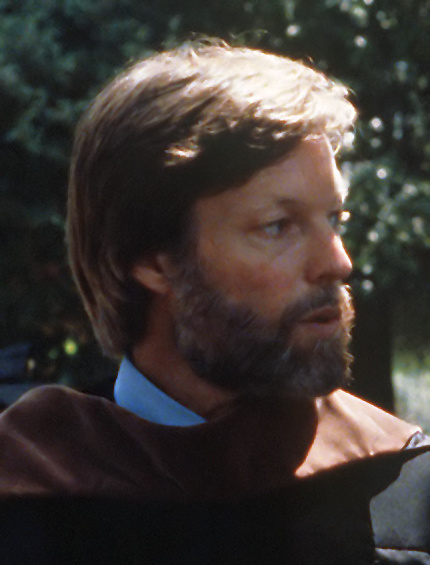
Richard Chamberlain — Best Actor in a Television Series, Drama winner

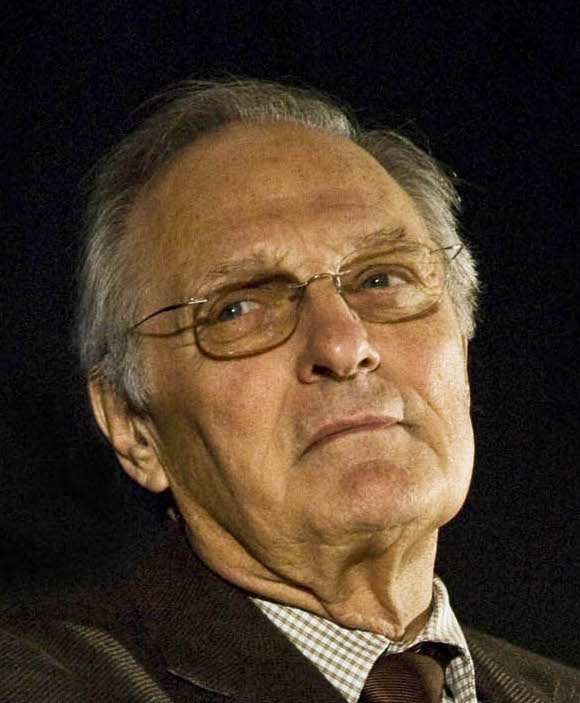
Alan Alda — Best Actor in a Television Series, Comedy or Musical winner

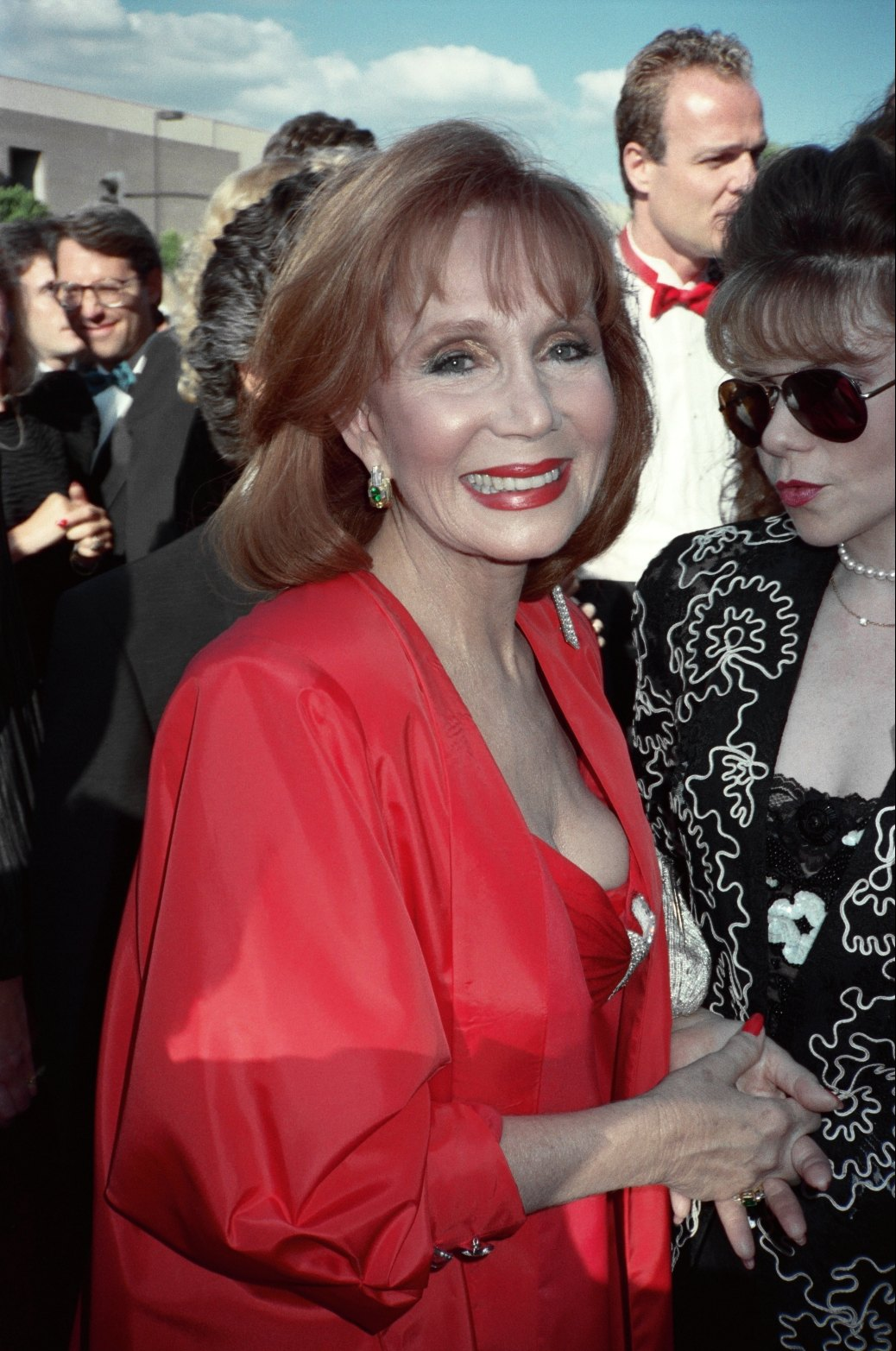
Katherine Helmond — Best Actress in a Television Series, Comedy or Musical winner

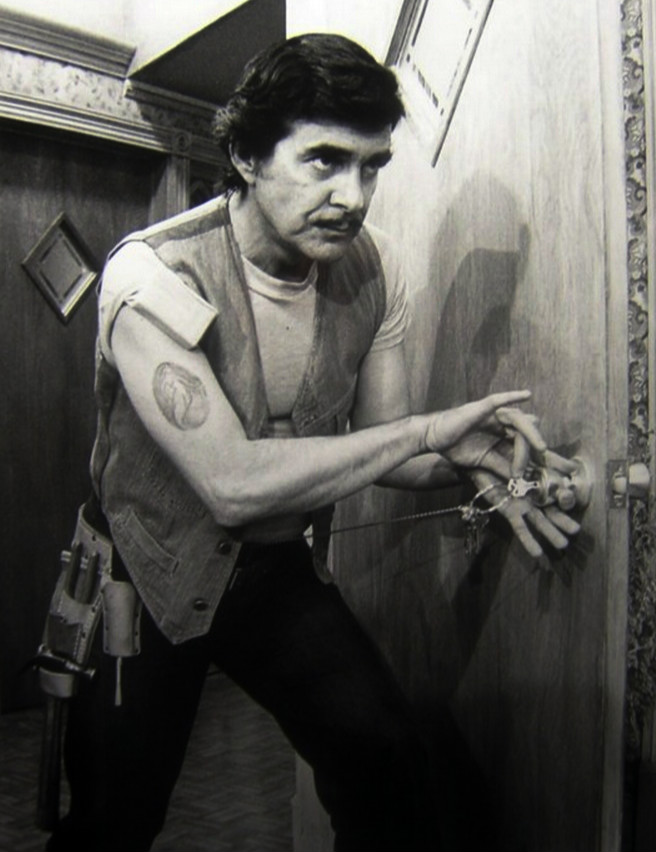
Pat Harrington Jr.- Best Supporting Actor in a Series, Miniseries or Television Film co-winner

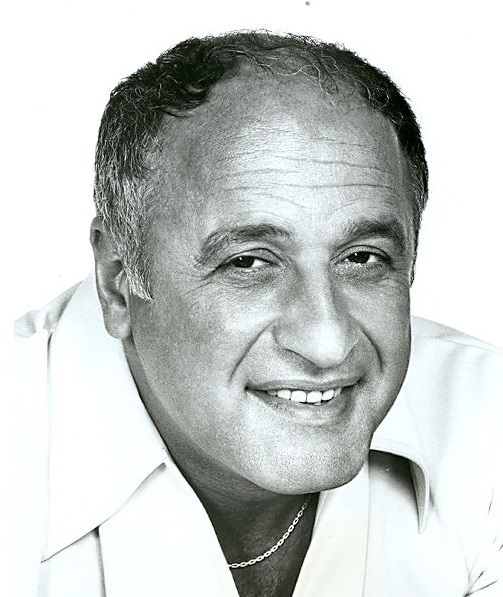
Vic Tayback — Best Supporting Actor in a Series, Miniseries or Television Film co-winner

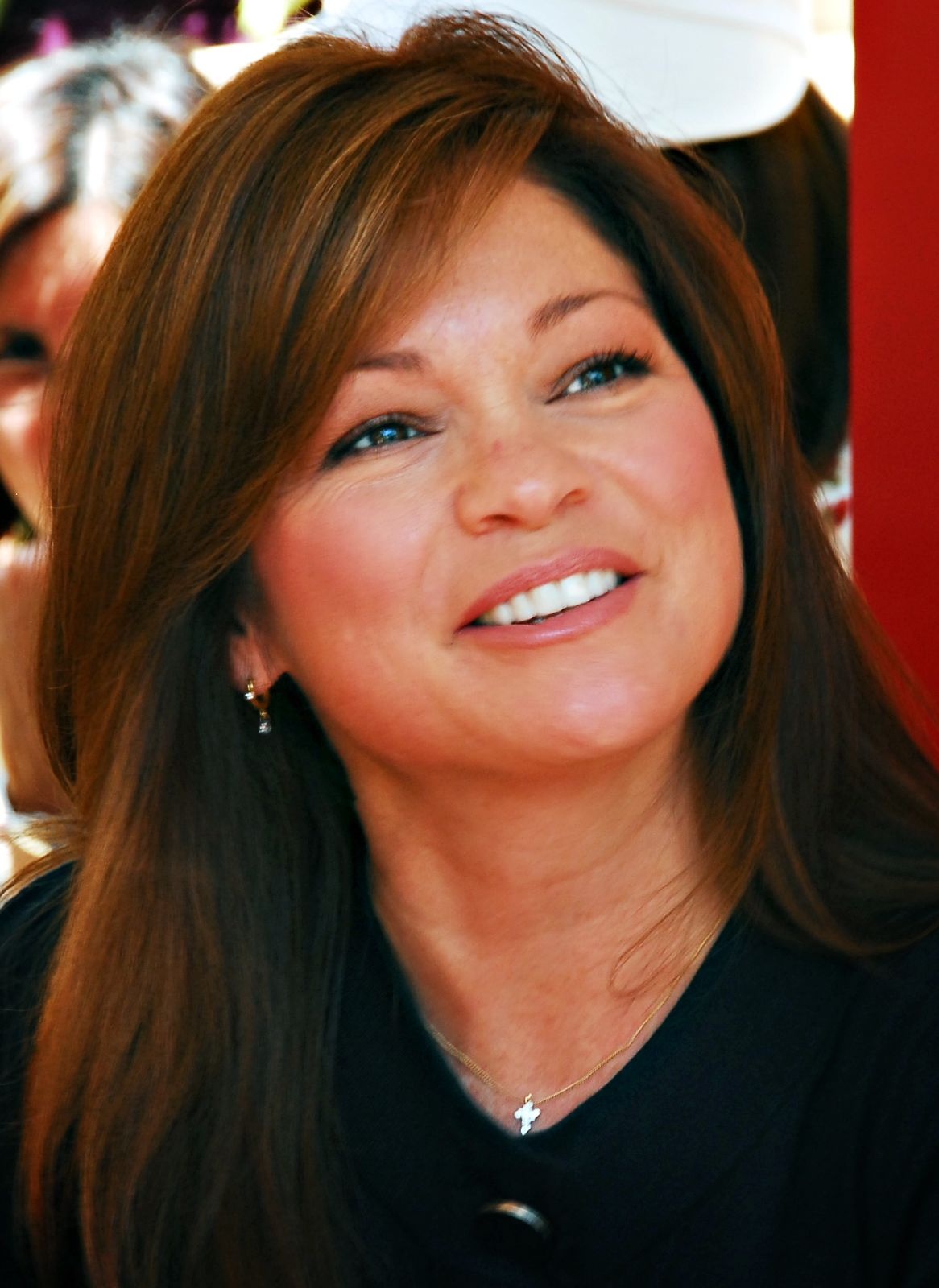
Valerie Bertinelli — Best Supporting Actress in a Series, Miniseries or Television Film co-winner

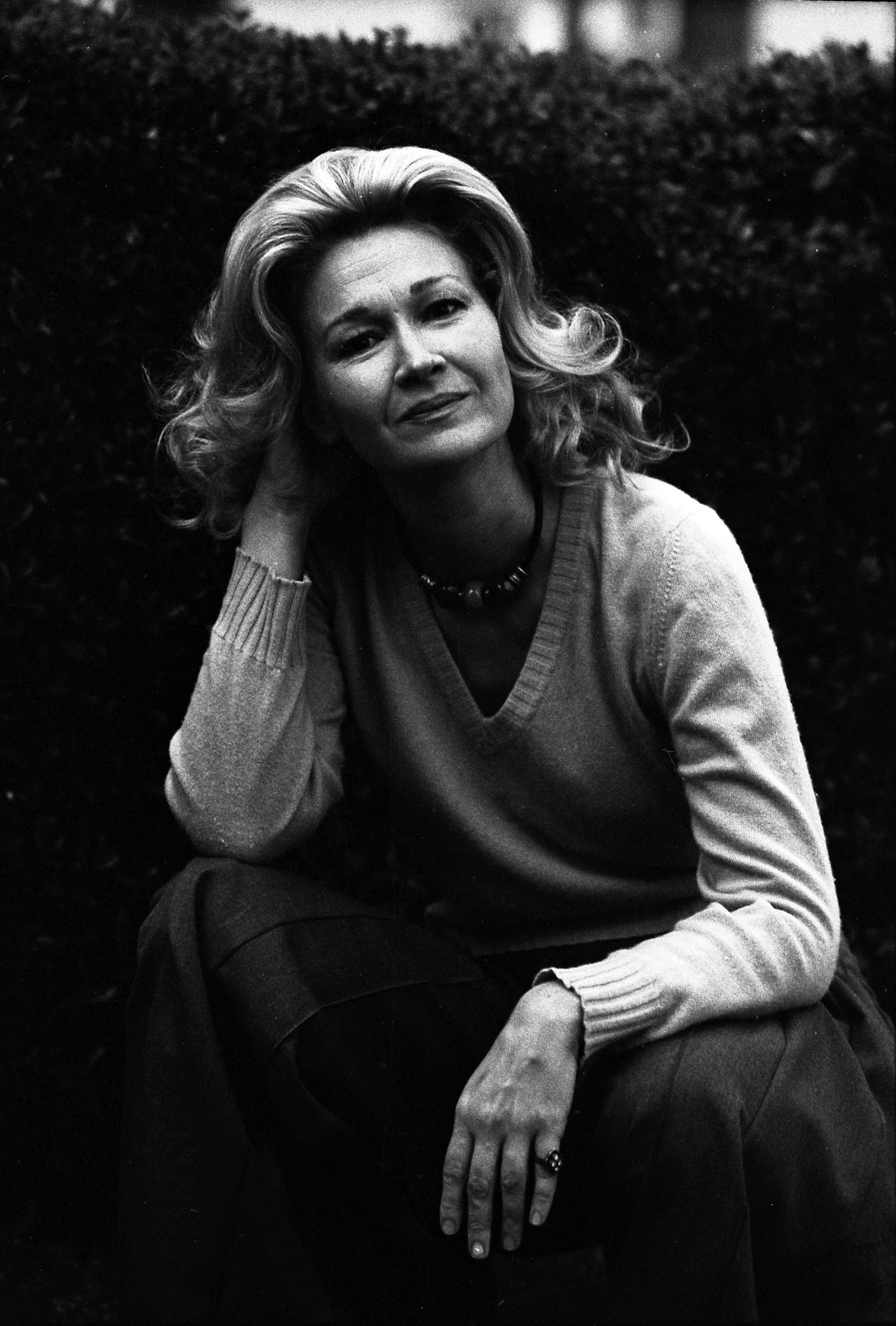
Diane Ladd — Best Supporting Actress in a Series, Miniseries or Television Film winner

=== Film ===
Best Motion Picture
Drama	Comedy or Musical
Ordinary People; The Elephant Man; The Ninth Configuration; Raging Bull; The Stunt Man	Coal Miner's Daughter; Airplane!; Fame; The Idolmaker; Melvin and Howard
Best Performance in a Motion Picture – Drama
Actor	Actress
Robert De Niro – Raging Bull as Jake La Motta; John Hurt – The Elephant Man as John Merrick; Jack Lemmon – Tribute as Scottie Templeton; Peter O'Toole – The Stunt Man as Eli Cross; Donald Sutherland – Ordinary People as Calvin Jarrett	Mary Tyler Moore – Ordinary People as Beth Jarrett; Ellen Burstyn – Resurrection as Edna Mae McCauley; Nastassja Kinski – Tess as Tess Durbeyfield; Deborah Raffin – Touched by Love as Lena Canada; Gena Rowlands – Gloria as Gloria Swenson
Best Performance in a Motion Picture – Comedy or Musical
Actor	Actress
Ray Sharkey – The Idolmaker as Vinnie Vacarri; Neil Diamond – The Jazz Singer as Yussel Rabinovitch; Tommy Lee Jones – Coal Miner's Daughter as Doolittle Mooney Lynn; Paul Le Mat – Melvin and Howard as Melvin Dummar; Walter Matthau – Hopscotch as Miles Kendig	Sissy Spacek – Coal Miner's Daughter as Loretta Lynn; Irene Cara – Fame as Coco Hernandez; Goldie Hawn – Private Benjamin as Judy Benjamin; Bette Midler – Divine Madness! as Herself / The Divine Miss M; Dolly Parton – 9 to 5 as Doralee Rhodes
Best Supporting Performance in a Motion Picture – Drama, Comedy or Musical
Supporting Actor	Supporting Actress
Timothy Hutton – Ordinary People as Conrad Jarrett; Judd Hirsch – Ordinary People as Tyrone Berger; Joe Pesci – Raging Bull as Joey LaMotta; Jason Robards – Melvin and Howard as Howard Hughes; Scott Wilson – The Ninth Configuration as Capt. Billy Cutshaw	Mary Steenburgen – Melvin and Howard as Lynda Dummar; Lucie Arnaz – The Jazz Singer as Molly Bell; Beverly D'Angelo – Coal Miner's Daughter as Patsy Cline; Cathy Moriarty – Raging Bull as Vicki LaMotta; Debra Winger – Urban Cowboy as Sissy Davis
Other
Best Director	Best Screenplay
Robert Redford – Ordinary People; David Lynch – The Elephant Man; Roman Polanski – Tess; Richard Rush – The Stunt Man; Martin Scorsese – Raging Bull	The Ninth Configuration – William Peter Blatty; The Elephant Man – Eric Bergren and Christopher De Vore; Ordinary People – Alvin Sargent; Raging Bull – Mardik Martin and Paul Schrader; The Stunt Man – Lawrence B. Marcus
Best Original Score	Best Original Song
The Stunt Man – Dominic Frontiere; American Gigolo – Giorgio Moroder; The Competition – Lalo Schifrin; The Empire Strikes Back – John Williams; Fame – Michael Gore; Somewhere in Time – John Barry	"Fame" (Michael Gore, Dean Pitchford) – Fame; "9 to 5" (Dolly Parton) – 9 to 5; "Call Me" (Giorgio Moroder, Debbie Harry) – American Gigolo; "Love on the Rocks" (Neil Diamond, Gilbert Bécaud) – The Jazz Singer; "Yesterday's Dreams" (Michel Legrand, Carol Connors, Johnny Mathis) – Falling in Love Again
New Star of the Year – Actor	New Star of the Year – Actress
Timothy Hutton – Ordinary People as Conrad Jarrett; Christopher Atkins – The Blue Lagoon as Richard LeStrange; William Hurt – Altered States as Dr. Edward Jessup; Michael O'Keefe – The Great Santini as Ben Meechum; Steve Railsback – The Stunt Man as Cameron	Nastassja Kinski – Tess as Tess Durbeyfield; Nancy Allen – Dressed to Kill as Liz Blake; Cathy Moriarty – Raging Bull as Vicki LaMotta; Dolly Parton – 9 to 5 as Doralee Rhodes; Debra Winger – Urban Cowboy as Sissy Davis
Best Foreign Film
Tess (United Kingdom); 'Breaker' Morant (Australia); Kagemusha (Japan); The Last Metro (France); My Brilliant Career (Australia); Special Treatment (Yugoslavia)

The following films received multiple nominations:

Nominations	Title
8	Ordinary People
7	Raging Bull
5	The Stunt Man
4	Coal Miner's Daughter
4	The Elephant Man
4	Fame
3	9 to 5
3	The Jazz Singer
3	Melvin and Howard
3	The Ninth Configuration
3	Tess
2	American Gigolo
2	The Idolmaker
2	Urban Cowboy

The following films received multiple wins:

Wins	Title
5	Ordinary People
2	Coal Miner's Daughter
2	Tess

=== Television ===
Best Television Series
Drama	Musical or Comedy
Shōgun: Dallas; Hart to Hart; Lou Grant; Vega$; The Scarlett O'Hara War	Taxi: Alice; The Love Boat; M*A*S*H; Soap
Best Performance in a Television Series Drama
Actor	Actress
Richard Chamberlain - Shōgun as John Blacthorne: Edward Asner - Lou Grant as Lou Grant; Larry Hagman - Dallas as J.R. Ewing; Robert Urich - Vega$ as Dan Tanna; Robert Wagner - Hart to Hart as Jonathan Hart	Yoko Shimada - Shōgun as Lady Toda Mariko: Barbara Bel Geddes - Dallas as Miss Ellie Ewing Farlow; Melissa Gilbert - Little House on the Prairie as Laura Ingalls Wilder; Linda Gray - Dallas as Sue Ellen Ewing; Stefanie Powers - Hart to Hart as Jennifer Hart
Best Performance in a Television Series – Musical or Comedy
Actor	Actress
Alan Alda - M*A*S*H as Capt. Benjamin "Hawkeye" Pierce: Judd Hirsch - Taxi as Alex Reiger; Hal Linden - Barney Miller as Capt. Bernard "Barney" Miller; Gavin MacLeod - The Love Boat as Capt. Merrill Stubing; Wayne Rogers - House Calls as Dr. Charley Michaels	Katherine Helmond - Soap as Jessica Tate: Loni Anderson - WKRP in Cincinnati as Jennifer Marlowe; Polly Holliday - Flo as Florence "Flo" Castleberry; Linda Lavin - Alice as Alice Hyatt; Lynn Redgrave - House Calls as Ann Atkinson
Best Supporting Performance in a Series, Miniseries or Television Film
Supporting Actor	Supporting Actress
Pat Harrington Jr. - One Day at a Time as Dwayne Schneider (tie) Vic Tayback - Alice as Mel Sharples (tie): Danny DeVito - Taxi as Louie De Palma; Andy Kaufman - Taxi as Latka Gravas; Geoffrey Lewis - Flo as Earl Tucker	Valerie Bertinelli - One Day at a Time as Barbara Cooper Royer (tie) Diane Ladd - Alice as Isabelle "Belle" Dupree (tie): Marilu Henner - Taxi as Elaine O'Connor Nardo; Beth Howland - Alice as Vera Gorman Novak; Linda Kelsey - Lou Grant as Billie Newman
Best Miniseries or Television Film
The Shadow Box: The Diary of Anne Frank; The Ordeal of Dr. Mudd; Playing for Time; A Tale of Two Cities

The following programs received multiple nominations:

Nominations	Title
5	Taxi
4	Alice
4	Dallas
3	Lou Grant
3	Shōgun
2	Flo
2	Hart to Hart
2	House Calls
2	The Love Boat
2	M*A*S*H
2	One Day at a Time
2	Soap
2	Vega$

The following programs received multiple wins:

Wins	Title
3	Shōgun
2	Alice
2	Once Day at a Time

=== Cecil B. DeMille Award ===
Gene Kelly

== See also ==
- 53rd Academy Awards
- 1st Golden Raspberry Awards
- 32nd Primetime Emmy Awards
- 33rd Primetime Emmy Awards
- 34th British Academy Film Awards
- 35th Tony Awards
- 1980 in film
- 1980 in American television
