= John Goldfarb, Please Come Home! =

1965 film directed by J. Lee Thompson

- 1965 theatrical poster
- Directed by: J. Lee Thompson
- Written by: William Peter Blatty
- Produced by: J. Lee Thompson; Steve Parker
- Starring: Shirley MacLaine; Peter Ustinov; Richard Crenna
- Cinematography: Leon Shamroy
- Edited by: William B. Murphy
- Music by: John Williams
- Production company: Parker–Orchard Productions
- Distributed by: 20th Century Fox
- Release date: March 24, 1965
- Running time: 96 minutes
- Country: United States
- Language: English
- Budget: $3,705,000
- Box office: $3,000,000 (US/ Canada rentals)

John Goldfarb, Please Come Home! is a 1965 American comedy film based on the novel by William Peter Blatty published in 1963. The film was directed by J. Lee Thompson. The film was shot in the Mojave Desert.

In the film, an American military aviator crashlands in a fictional Arab country. He is held captive, but the country's leader is informed of his past career as a star of college football. He arranges an exhibition football match between his country's university team and the Notre Dame Fighting Irish, using the captive aviator for leverage.

== Plot ==
The comic spoof of the Cold War was inspired by a May 1960 incident involving American Francis Gary Powers, a CIA operative whose U-2 spy plane was shot down over the Soviet Union, sparking an international diplomatic incident. Writer William Peter Blatty's tale concerns John "Wrong-Way" Goldfarb, a former college football star who once ran 95 yards for a touchdown in the wrong direction. Now a U-2 pilot, his plane malfunctions and crashes in the mythical Arab kingdom of Fawzia.

The country's leader threatens to turn him over to the Soviets unless he agrees to coach a football team. Jenny Ericson, the magazine journalist who made Goldfarb famous, is on an undercover assignment as a member of the King's harem, and when she discovers she was wrong in thinking the King is no longer romantically interested in his wives, she seeks help from Goldfarb. The King blackmails the U.S. Department of State into arranging an exhibition football game between the Notre Dame Fighting Irish and his own team from Fawz University. Jenny becomes a cheerleader and then the quarterback who scores the winning touchdown for Fawz University.

== Cast ==
- Shirley MacLaine as Jenny
- Peter Ustinov as the King
- Richard Crenna as Goldfarb
- Jim Backus as Miles Whitepaper
- Scott Brady as Coach Sakalakis
- Fred Clark as Heinous Overreach
- Wilfrid Hyde-White as Mustafa Guz
- Harry Morgan as Secretary of State Deems Sarajevo
- Patrick Adiarte as Prince Ammud
- Richard Deacon as Secretary of Defense Charles Maginot
- Jerome Cowan as Ambassador Brinkley
- Leon Askin as Samir
- David Lewis as Stottle Cronkite
- Milton Frome as Air Force General
- Charles Lane as Strife Magazine Editor
- Jerry Orbach as Pinkerton
- Jackie Coogan as Father Ryan
- Nai Bonet as Specialty Dancer
- Sultanna as Specialty Dancer
- Dick Wilson as Frobish

== Original novel ==
Blatty was inspired to write the story by Gary Francis Powers. It was originally written as a screenplay. Blatty pitched the project to Steve Parker and Parker's wife Shirley MacLaine who agreed to be attached. However no studios would finance. "Everyone was afraid we'd hurt people's feelings", said Blatty. Blatty briefly had "an arrangement" with Columbia Pictures but they decided not to finance as well, after the University of Notre Dame refused permission to use the university's name.

At Parker's suggestion, Blatty reworked it as a novel, which was published by Doubleday in 1963 (ISBN 0-553-14251-8). The Los Angeles Times called it "a thigh slapper". The New York Times called it "a wildly comic exercise by a talented humourist." It sold 8,500 copies in hard back and 200,000 copies in paperback.

Blatty said "It took Tom Jones and Dr Strangelove to break the fear of satire, which had been around for about 400 years. Now everyone's on the bandwagon. But for us it was a tough two year battle to get this film made."

== Production ==
In September 1963, Hedda Hopper reported Arthur Jacbos and J. Lee Thompson were reading the book. Jacobs and Thompson had made What a Way to Go with Shirley MacLaine at 20th Century Fox, which had been a hit. Fox agreed to finance Goldfarb.

The film was budgeted at $4.5 million and, like What a Way to Go, was mostly shot on the Fox backlot. There was location filming in the Mojave Desert in May.

Montgomery Clift was reportedly offered a lead role and turned it down, even though he was not being offered much work at the time, because he disliked the script.

Thompson had been unable to find a male star, and eventually went with Richard Crenna, then best known for his work on The Real McCoys. Fox took an option on his services for three more movies.

Hedda Hopper saw a preview in November 1964 and called it a "waste of money and actors." She later wrote Thompson "went hog wild" on the film. Representatives from Notre Dame also saw a preview on 17 November. This was to have major ramifications for the movie.

== Lawsuit ==
Fox expected the film to open on Christmas Day 1964, however in early December the University of Notre Dame filed a suit against Fox and the publishers of the book to stop the movie and recall the novel saying both did "immeasurable damage" to the school's reputation, particularly the final football sequence. The university sought no monetary damages, just that the film not be released. Fox said the film "is obviously a good natured lampoon of contemporary American life... It is unfortunate that Notre Dame is trying to transform a zany fantasy into a realistic drama." Blatty said "I feel curiouser and curiouser that a great university like Notre Dame should stoop to – if you pardon the expression – to doing battle with a farcical piece of fiction."

The university said it had denied Fox permission to use their name, but Fox denied it had ever asked for permission. On December 17, a judge ruled the film could not be shown in New York state, claiming that the novel and film "knowingly and illegally" exploited the name, symbols, and institution of the football team and university. The judge also ordered that the book be recalled. Fox tried to get a stay of the injunction but was unsuccessful. They offered the 200 theatres that were going to show John Goldfarb another film, The Pleasure Seekers.

The ruling was highly controversial, and the ACLU became involved. Fox appealed the decision, and the case was heard again in January. The following month the five-judge appellate court unanimously reversed the original judge's decision; Fox had won. The case went to the Court of Appeals who upheld Fox's victory 4–2, enabling the studio to release the film. The studio rushed the movie into release in March, and Notre Dame decided not to try suing in another jurisdiction.

== Reception ==
=== Box office ===
According to Fox records, the film needed to earn $6.2 million ($47 million in modern dollars) in rentals to break even, but only made $3.9 million.

Later, Henny and Jim Backus wrote a travel book called What Are You Doing After the Orgy? The title is taken from one of his lines in the film.

== Legacy ==
Blatty would later model two characters in his 1970 bestselling novel The Exorcist on people involved in making John Goldfarb. MacLaine, who was also a friend and neighbor of his for several years, inspired that novel's main character, Chris MacNeil. MacLaine noted later that, like her fictional analogue, she had had at the time a European couple (French, in her case, as opposed to the novel's Germans) working as household staff, and Chris's dialogue included things MacLaine had said in the past. Thompson in turn inspired Burke Dennings, the director of the film MacNeil is making in the novel, and had even been cast in the role early in the 1973 film adaptation of the novel; the role was ultimately played by Jack McGowran.

== See also ==
- List of American football films
