= Special Bulletin =

1983 American drama TV film by Edward Zwick

- Ed Flanders as RBS anchor John Woodley.
- Genre: Drama; Docufiction
- Teleplay by: Marshall Herskovitz
- Story by: Edward Zwick; Marshall Herskovitz
- Directed by: Edward Zwick
- Starring: Ed Flanders; Kathryn Walker
- Music by: Ferdinand Jay Smith (promo and news music)
- Country of origin: United States
- Original language: English

Production
- Executive producer: Don Ohlmeyer
- Producers: Marshall Herskovitz; Edward Zwick
- Editor: Arden Rynew
- Running time: 105 minutes
- Production company: Ohlmeyer Communications Company

Original release
- Network: NBC
- Release: March 20, 1983

Special Bulletin is a 1983 American drama television film directed by Edward Zwick and written by Marshall Herskovitz, based on a story by both. It was an early collaboration between the two, who would later produce such series as thirtysomething and My So-Called Life. The film was first broadcast March 20, 1983 on NBC as part of NBC Sunday Night at the Movies.

In the film, a terrorist group of anti-nuclear activists brings a homemade atomic bomb aboard a tugboat in the harbor of Charleston, South Carolina in order to blackmail the U.S. government into disabling its nuclear weapons, and the incident is caught live on television. Primarily produced on videotape, it simulates a series of live news broadcasts on the fictional RBS Network.

== Synopsis ==
The entirety of the film is portrayed through the perspective of a news broadcast on the fictional RBS television network. It begins with promotional scenes from other RBS shows; one is cut off by a special bulletin from RBS News.

In Charleston, South Carolina, a skirmish is fought between Coast Guard personnel and a group of terrorists aboard a docked tugboat called Liberty May. Caught in the crossfire while reporting an unrelated story, RBS reporter Steve Levitt and his cameraman George Takashima are taken hostage aboard the boat. As part of a deal to release the surrendered Coast Guardsmen, the terrorists – Doctors Bruce Lyman and David McKeeson, political activist Frieda Barton, social worker Diane Silverman and mentally unstable ex-convict Jim Seaver – ask to broadcast their demands to the U.S. government over RBS. Lyman demands the triggers for all 968 nuclear weapons in the area delivered to them, intending to destroy them by dropping them in the Atlantic Ocean. Lyman states that failure to meet this demand or any deviation from the plan will result in the group detonating their own improvised nuclear device stowed aboard Liberty May.

Subsequent investigations into Lyman and McKeeson reveal their backgrounds in nuclear weaponry and technology. Lyman himself was noted as being instrumental in the construction of the neutron bomb before he became a radical anti-nuclear demonstrator. McKeeson shows the terrorists' bomb to the reporters, explaining that not only is he the man who built it, but he has fitted the device with several fail-safes and anti-tamper devices, revealing that he is the only person who can disarm it. Tensions rise when a Coast Guardsman injured in the initial firefight dies. Lyman refuses to release Levitt and Takashima in order to maintain communication with RBS. Eventually, the Department of Defense agrees to the terrorists' demands and a van arrives outside Liberty May, supposedly carrying the nuclear triggers.

Moments before the handover, however, a power failure occurs in Charleston – all televisions, including one on the tugboat, go off the air. This proves to be a deliberate distraction as a Delta Force commando team storms Liberty May from offshore, killing all the terrorists except for Barton. McKeeson is cornered but commits suicide to escape capture. While Levitt and Takashima are safely taken off the boat, they continue to broadcast on the dock. Barton is also taken off the boat by the Charleston Police Department, while the Nuclear Emergency Support Team boards the boat to disarm the device. A camera aboard the boat records the team working, when they accidentally trigger one of McKeeson's safeguards.

As the team frantically try to stabilize the device, the feed is suddenly interrupted by static, at which point the broadcast returns to the RBS studio, the anchors clearly shaken by what they have just witnessed. The broadcast shifts to another reporter, Meg Barclay, who is aboard USS Yorktown (CV-10) two miles away. Footage reveals that the device exploded, resulting in a 23-kiloton blast that has caused a firestorm, destroying downtown Charleston. Both Levitt and Takashima, last seen standing a few feet from ground zero, have been killed.

Three days later, RBS broadcasts the aftermath of the detonation. Thanks to an earlier ordered evacuation, only 2,000 citizens perished in the detonation. However, tens of thousands more have been left injured, traumatized or homeless, and the surrounding area will be uninhabitable for decades to come. The film ends as the news bulletin reports on other stories across the world.

== Cast ==
- Ed Flanders as John Woodley, RBS Anchor
- Kathryn Walker as Susan Myles, RBS Anchor
- Christopher Allport as Steven Levitt, WPIV Reporter
- David Clennon as Dr. Bruce Lyman, Terrorist
- Rosalind Cash as Frieda Barton, Terrorist
- Roxanne Hart as Megan "Meg" Barclay, RBS Reporter
- David Rasche as Dr. David McKeeson, Terrorist
- Lane Smith as Morton Sanders, RBS Reporter
- Ebbe Roe Smith as Jim Seaver, Terrorist
- Roberta Maxwell as Diane Silverman, Terrorist
- J. Wesley Huston as Bernard Frost, WPIV
- George Morfogen as Dr. Morse Mansfield
- William A. Gamble Sr. as Special Forces Commander
- Michael Madsen as Jimmy Lenox

== Reception and legacy ==
Leonard Maltin's Movie and Video Guide rated Special Bulletin "way above average."

The Washington Post described it as "A shrewd, keen, wise, hip, occasionally lacerating and sometimes gravely funny dark parody of network TV news coverage." Also, "At times, the unfolding story in Special Bulletin comes across as ludicrous, but then one has to think, how much more ludicrous is it than some of the actual news events of the past 15 years or so, and the way television has honed its way of covering them? It's a process that deserves scrutiny not just in poker-faced journals and ivory tower think tanks but on television. Praiseworthy trailblazers like the ABC News late night Viewpoint broadcasts have done this one way. Special Bulletin does it in another way-not a better one, perhaps, but in one more accessible to greater numbers of viewers."

The New York Times stated that NBC's owned-and-operated stations in New York, Chicago, Los Angeles, Washington and Cleveland had received 2,200 calls from alarmed viewers. NBC's flagship station, WNBC-TV in New York, received 731 calls, 44 of them critical, and 43 asking if the program was real. The station manager of WCIV, Celia Shaw, said, "In retrospect, maybe it would have been better with a theoretical city, rather than Charleston, with its large number of military installations." Numerous NBC affiliates, and newspapers had also received calls. Canada's CHCH-TV (also broadcast the movie) received 45 calls.

=== Impact ===
The first of the carefully worded disclaimers.

Several factors enhanced Special Bulletin's resemblance to an actual live news broadcast. It was shot on videotape rather than film, which gave the presentation the visual appearance of being "live". Other small touches, such as actors hesitating or stumbling over dialogue (as if being spoken extemporaneously) and small technical glitches (as would often be experienced in a live broadcast), contributed to the realism. With the exception of RBS network and news jingles, there is also no musical score used. The end credits are accompanied by the sound of a teletype.

In addition, some specific references made the movie especially realistic to residents of Charleston. The call letters of the fictional Charleston RBS affiliate, WPIV, were close to those of NBC's then-affiliate in Charleston, WCIV. Also, a key plot element mentions "a power failure at a transmitter in North Charleston"; the TV transmitter sites are actually in Awendaw.

The filmmakers were required to include on-screen disclaimers at the beginning and end of every commercial break in order to assure viewers that the events were a dramatization. The word "dramatization" also appeared on the screen during key moments of the original broadcast. Additionally, WCIV placed the word "Fiction" on screen at all times during its showing of the movie. The film also made use of "accelerated time"—events said to take place hours apart instead are shown only minutes apart. In addition, NBC sent releases to the various military commands in the Charleston area of the movie's airing, so they could inform their attached servicemembers to be prepared for the possibility of nervous phone calls from home, and could reassure their relatives and friends back home that what was airing was in fact a fictional dramatization, and not a real news story. Nonetheless, there were still news reports of isolated panic in Charleston. Much as claimed with the famous 1938 radio broadcast of The War of the Worlds, it was entirely possible for viewers to tune in between disclaimers and make a snap judgment about what they were seeing, although in both cases a quick flip of the dial would reveal that no other stations were covering this supposedly major news event. When the program was rebroadcast in 1984, the only disclaimers were made at the commercial breaks; there were none on the screen while the action was taking place.

WTMJ-TV in Milwaukee, Wisconsin was the only NBC affiliate which refused to air the film out of concern that, as station president Mike McCormick stated, "people will be deceived into believing it's an actual telecast." However, some other NBC affiliates preempted the broadcast because they had previously scheduled local programming for the evening, before the film was placed by the network into that timeslot at the last minute.

=== Accolades ===
Special Bulletin was nominated for six Emmy awards and won four, including Outstanding Drama Special. It also won Directors Guild of America and Writers Guild of America prizes for Zwick and Herskovitz, as well as the Humanitas Prize, the latter award which irked former NBC president Reuven Frank. In his book on TV news, Out of Thin Air, Frank called Special Bulletin "junk" and claimed he wanted to return his own Humanitas Prize in protest, "but I couldn't find it."

== Home video ==
Lorimar Home Video issued Special Bulletin on VHS and Betamax, and Warner Home Video would later reissue it; these releases omit the on-screen "dramatization" overlay. Starting in January 2010, Warner Bros. made the film available on DVD for one year as part of its Warner Archive Collection. Warner's rights have since reverted to the production company and the DVD is currently out of print. However multiple uploads of the movie are on YouTube.

== See also ==
- Countdown to Looking Glass, a 1984 Canadian TV film that used simulated news broadcasts to chronicle a Cold War showdown between the United States and the Soviet Union.
- The Day After, a 1983 TV film about a nuclear war and its effects on the Midwest U.S.
- Threads, a 1984 BBC film inspired by Academy Award-winning docudrama The War Game.
- The War Game, a 1965 pseudo-documentary in the form of a newsmagazine depicting a nuclear attack on Britain. Filmed for broadcast on the BBC it was not aired due to concerns that it would panic the population.
- Analog horror
- Without Warning, an apocalyptic 1994 TV film also presented as a faux news broadcast.
- Shot-on-video film
