= The Exorcist III =

1990 film by William Peter Blatty

- Theatrical release poster
- Directed by: William Peter Blatty
- Screenplay by: William Peter Blatty
- Based on: Legion by William Peter Blatty
- Produced by: Carter DeHaven
- Starring: George C. Scott; Ed Flanders; Jason Miller; Scott Wilson; Nicol Williamson; Brad Dourif
- Cinematography: Gerry Fisher
- Edited by: Todd Ramsay; Peter Lee Thompson
- Music by: Barry De Vorzon
- Production companies: Morgan Creek Productions; Carter DeHaven Productions
- Distributed by: 20th Century Fox
- Release date: August 17, 1990
- Running time: 110 minutes
- Country: United States
- Language: English
- Budget: $11 million
- Box office: $44 million

The Exorcist III is a 1990 American supernatural psychological horror film written for the screen and directed by William Peter Blatty, based on his 1983 novel Legion. It is the third installment in The Exorcist film series and a direct sequel to The Exorcist (1973). It is also the final film in Blatty's "Trilogy of Faith", following The Ninth Configuration (1980). The film stars George C. Scott, Ed Flanders, Jason Miller, Scott Wilson, Nicol Williamson, and Brad Dourif.

The film follows a character from the original film, Lieutenant William F. Kinderman, who investigates a series of demonic murders in Georgetown that have the hallmarks of the Gemini, a deceased serial killer. Blatty based aspects of the Gemini Killer on the real-life Zodiac Killer, although there is no evidence of interest in this film by the Zodiac Killer.

Blatty, who wrote The Exorcist novel and the screenplay for its 1973 film adaptation, conceived The Exorcist III with The Exorcist director William Friedkin attached to direct. When Friedkin left the project, Blatty adapted the script into the 1983 novel Legion. Morgan Creek Productions bought the film rights, with Blatty as director. Initially designed to be a standalone adaptation of that novel (hence the anachronistic elements which contradict Friedkin's adaptation of The Exorcist), the final cut wound up being an official entry in the filmed series due to Morgan Creek demanding extensive last-minute changes — including the insistence of bringing back a key cast member from the 1973 film, as well as an exorcism sequence for the climax — much to Blatty's frustration. Though some of the original footage appears permanently lost, Scream Factory released a director's cut closer to Blatty's vision in 2016, with footage assembled from various sources.

The Exorcist III was released in the United States on August 17, 1990, by 20th Century Fox. The film grossed $44 million domestically against a production budget of $11 million and received mixed reviews from critics. However, the film gained a cult following over time and is now largely considered the best sequel of the franchise.

== Plot ==
In Georgetown, fifteen years after Regan MacNeil's exorcism in 1973, (Note: In The Exorcist (1973), the events take place in 1973. However, the film gives 1975 as the year of Father Damien Karras's death on his headstone. The discrepancy reflects changes made to connect the originally separate Legion project to the earlier film.) Father Joseph Dyer and Lieutenant William F. Kinderman reminisce about Father Damien Karras. The following night, an incident at a church occurs indicating the presence of something supernatural, which causes the Christ figure on a crucifix to open its eyes. A man walking on the street speaks about a dream of "falling down a long flight of steps", suggesting that someone is committing murders linked to Karras' death.

The next morning, Kinderman is called to the scene of a murder. Thomas Kintry, a black youth, has had his head replaced with the head from a statue of Jesus. Afterwards, a priest, Father Kanavan, is murdered in the confessional one night, and is also decapitated. The fingerprints at the crime scenes do not match, indicating different people committed each murder. Dyer falls ill and ends up in hospital which houses a psychiatric ward for the elderly. He is also murdered and decapitated with all of his blood neatly placed in small bottles. After questioning patients in the mental ward, assisted by Sergeant Mel Atkins, Kinderman notices that the murders fit the modus operandi of James Venamun, "The Gemini Killer", a serial killer who was executed fifteen years earlier.

Kinderman questions another patient at the hospital, elderly Mrs. Clelia, who knows nothing of Dyer's murder. He then visits the head of a psychiatric ward, Dr. Temple, who relates the history of one of his patients. The patient was found wandering aimlessly fifteen years previously with amnesia. He was locked up, catatonic until six weeks ago when he became lucid and violent, claiming to be the Gemini Killer. The patient is Kinderman's old friend Damien Karras, who is in fact possessed by Venamun. The Gemini Killer expresses ignorance of Karras, but boasts of murdering Father Dyer and the other victims years ago. After his appearance changes to that of the Gemini Killer, he threatens to punish Kinderman if the paper doesn't report the Gemini Killer is still killing.

Kinderman visits Father Riley, the head of the church council that Kanavan and Dyer worked for and that Kanavan himself ran fifteen years earlier. When discussing a connection between the murders, Kinderman believes the suspect to be possessed by the Gemini Killer and questions Riley on his belief in possessions. Riley suggests he talk to Father Paul Morning, who handled an exorcism in the Philippines and that "his hair turned white overnight" as a result. Riley reveals a connection between the victims regarding the Regan MacNeil case: Kanavan allowing that exorcism to take place, Dyer being friends with the MacNeil family, and Kintry's mother being the one who decoded a backwards message on a tape recording of Pazuzu – the entity who possessed Regan.

That night, Nurse Amy Keating is murdered, and Dr. Temple dies by suicide. Kinderman returns to see Karras who is still possessed by the Gemini Killer. The killer explains that he is being aided by "The Master", presumably Pazuzu, who was vengeful for Karras expelling him from Regan's body. "The Master" took the spirit of Venamun (who was executed the same night), and placed it in Karras's body with Karras' spirit locked inside to witness the horrific acts as punishment. The Gemini Killer has possessed other people in the institution to carry out his murders and forced Dr. Temple to help him.

The Gemini Killer possesses another elderly patient, who leaves the hospital disguised as a nurse and attempts to murder Kinderman and his family at their home. The attack abruptly ends when Father Morning arrives at the hospital to confront Karras, having sensed a calling to perform another exorcism. As he attempts to cleanse Karras, "The Master" intervenes, taking over Karras' body, and Morning is severely mutilated. Kinderman rushes back to the hospital with the now unconscious patient and attempts to euthanize Karras. The possessed Karras then torments and attempts to kill Kinderman.

As "The Master" chants how victory is on his side, Father Morning regains consciousness and tells Karras to fight. The real Karras briefly regains his free will and cries out to Kinderman to shoot and kill him. Kinderman does this, freeing Karras from both the Gemini Killer and his "Master". Later, Kinderman and Sergeant Atkins watch Karras' funeral, his tombstone listing his death at the age of 40 on October 9, 1975.

== Cast ==
- George C. Scott as Lieutenant William F. Kinderman
- Ed Flanders as Father Joseph Dyer
- Brad Dourif as James Venamun / The "Gemini Killer"
- Scott Wilson as Dr. Temple
- Nancy Fish as Nurse Emily Allerton
- Nicol Williamson as Father Paul Morning
- Jason Miller as Patient X / Damien Karras
- Barbara Baxley as Shirley
- Grand L. Bush as Sergeant Mel Atkins
- Harry Carey Jr. as Father Tom Kanavan
- George DiCenzo as Dr. Alan Stedman
- Tyra Ferrell as Nurse Blaine
- Lois Foraker as Nurse Merrin
- Don Gordon as Ryan
- Mary Jackson as Mrs. Clelia
- Zohra Lampert as Mary Kinderman
- Ken Lerner as Dr. Freedman
- Viveca Lindfors as Nurse X
- Lee Richardson as Father Riley
- Tracy Thorne as Nurse Amy Keating
- Sherrie Wills as Julie Kinderman
- Clifford David as Dr. Bruno
- James Burgess as Thomas Kintry
- Kevin Corrigan as Altar Boy
- Peggy Alston as Mrs. Kintry
- Demetrios Pappageorge as Casperelli
- Jodi Long as Dream Woman
- Samuel L. Jackson as Blind Dream Man
- Amelia Campbell as Dream Girl
- C. Everett Koop as Himself
- Larry King as Himself
- Patrick Ewing as Angel of Death
- Fabio as Angel (uncredited)
- Colleen Dewhurst as Pazuzu (uncredited voice)
- Teresa Wright as Penitent (uncredited)

== Production ==
=== Development ===
William Peter Blatty, who wrote The Exorcist novel and the screenplay for its film adaptation, initially had no desire to write a sequel. However, he eventually came up with a story titled Legion, featuring Lieutenant William F. Kinderman, a prominent character in the original Exorcist novel (though he played a minor role in the eventual film), as the protagonist. Blatty conceived Legion as a feature film with William Friedkin, director of The Exorcist, attached to direct. Despite the critical and commercial failure of the previous sequel Exorcist II: The Heretic, Warner Bros. Pictures was keen to proceed with Blatty and Friedkin's plans for another Exorcist film. Blatty said that "everybody wanted Exorcist III… I hadn't written the script, but I had the story in my head… and Billy [Friedkin] loved it". Friedkin, however, soon left the project due to conflicting opinions between him and Blatty on the film.

The project went into development hell, and Blatty turned his screenplay into the novel Legion, published in 1983. The novel became a bestseller. Blatty later returned to the story as a screenplay for The Exorcist III. Steve Jaffe, who had worked as a publicist for the original The Exorcist film and later served as an associate producer on The Exorcist III, helped Blatty secure the opportunity to direct the film. Film companies Morgan Creek and Carolco both wanted to make the film; Blatty decided upon Morgan Creek after Carolco suggested the idea of a grown-up Regan MacNeil giving birth to possessed twins.

Blatty offered directorial responsibilities to John Carpenter. Carpenter was initially interested, but eventually backed out over creative differences. In the book John Carpenter: The Prince of Darkness, Carpenter explained his reasons for not directing the film: "I met with Blatty over the course of a week, perhaps a week and a half. He had director approval, so he was testing and probing me to find out who I was and how smart I was and whether or not I should direct [the film]. I was ambivalent about the script, primarily because it didn't have an exorcism. Our time together was a lot of fun. We talked about everything. I kept suggesting a third-act exorcism and pushing the both of us to come up with some new, exciting, and grotesque devil gags. Blatty was resistant. He wanted to direct it and wanted to stay very close to his novel. I respected Blatty, figured out that he really wanted badly to direct the picture, and felt that I couldn't get what I needed. So I withdrew from The Exorcist III." As per the stipulations for his deal with Morgan Creek, Blatty was to direct the movie himself, and it was to be filmed on location in Georgetown.

=== Casting ===
The central role of Lt. Kinderman had to be recast, as Lee J. Cobb, who played the part in The Exorcist, had died in 1976. George C. Scott signed up for the role, impressed by Blatty's screenplay: "It's a horror film and much more… It's a real drama, intricately crafted, with offbeat interesting characters… and that's what makes it genuinely frightening."

Several cast members from Blatty's previous film The Ninth Configuration (1980) appear in The Exorcist III: Jason Miller, reprising the role of Father Damien Karras from The Exorcist (billed only as "Patient X" in the end credits); Ed Flanders, taking on the role of Father Joseph Dyer (previously played by William O'Malley); George DiCenzo and Scott Wilson. There are also cameo appearances by basketball player Patrick Ewing and his college coach John Thompson, model Fabio, ex-Surgeon General C. Everett Koop, television host Larry King, and an early appearance by Samuel L. Jackson in a dream sequence. Zohra Lampert, who plays Kinderman's wife Mary, is remembered for her lead role in another horror film, 1971's Let's Scare Jessica to Death.

=== Filming ===
With an $11 million budget, the tentatively-titled Exorcist: Legion was shot on location in Georgetown for eight weeks in mid-1989. Additional interior filming took place in DEG Studios in Wilmington, North Carolina. Blatty completed principal photography of the film on time, and only slightly over budget. However, four months later, Morgan Creek informed Blatty that a new ending had to be shot. Blatty said that "James Robinson, the owner of the company, [had a] secretary [who] had insisted to him that this has nothing to do with The Exorcist. There had to be an exorcism." 20th Century Fox put up an additional $4 million in post production to film an effects-laden exorcism sequence featuring Nicol Williamson as Father Paul Morning, a character added just for the new climax. Brad Dourif, who initially portrayed the dual role of Damien Karras and James Venamun, the Gemini Killer, was re-cast with Jason Miller. When Miller proved unable to recite a lot of his scenes due to his severe alcoholism, Blatty decided to call Dourif back for the role of the latter. Dourif agreed on the condition that he would be provided a hotel room where he could have ample time to rehearse with an acting assistant, as he needed to again channel the essence he had lost in the past months after portraying the character during the first round of principal photography. All scenes with Dourif in the final cut had been entirely re-shot in Hollywood Center Studios in Los Angeles, California; a performance he was not completely satisfied with, as felt he gave a much stronger interpretation when they filmed in Wilmington. Blatty had to make the best of it in the narrative while racing to complete the film.

Blatty confirmed that when the possessed Karras speaks in an asexual voice, saying, "I must save my son, the Gemini," that this is, in fact, either a returned Pazuzu or, as Blatty put it, "Old Scratch himself" taking control. This ties into the revelation earlier in the film that the Gemini was sent into Karras' body as revenge for the Regan MacNeil exorcism. The altered voice in the climax is deliberately similar to that of Mercedes McCambridge, who did the uncredited voice of the demon in The Exorcist, and the role is essayed in The Exorcist III by Colleen Dewhurst, who was uncredited (actress Dewhurst was twice married to, and twice divorced from, actor George C. Scott). One scene missing from the re-filmed climax, but which appears in the trailer, shows Karras/the Gemini Killer "morphing" through a variety of faces. It was left out of the film because Blatty was not happy with the special effects work.

On the climactic exorcism scene, Blatty later said: "It's all right, but it's utterly unnecessary and it changes the character of the piece." Although at the time, Blatty told the press that he was happy to re-shoot the film's ending and have the story climax with a frenzy of special effects, apparently this compromise was forced on Blatty against his wishes:

The original story that I sold [Morgan Creek] (and that I shot) ended with Kinderman blowing away Patient X. There was no exorcism. But it was a Mexican stand-off between me and the studio. I was entitled to one preview, then they could go and do what they wanted with the picture. They gave me a preview but it was the lowest end preview audience I have ever seen in my life. They dragged in zombies from Haiti to watch this film. It was unbelievable. But I decided, better I should do it than anyone else. I foolishly thought: I can do a good exorcism, I'll turn this pig's ear into a silk purse. So I did it.

Working on the film, Brad Dourif recalled: "We all felt really bad about it. But Blatty tried to do his best under very difficult circumstances. And I remember George C. Scott saying that the folks would only be satisfied if Madonna came out and sang a song at the end!" Dourif feels that "the original version was a hell of a lot purer and I liked it much more. As it stands now, it's a mediocre film. There are parts that have no right to be there."

The execution-style ending that Blatty pitched to the studio – which was in the shooting script and actually filmed – differs radically from the ending of both the novel and the first screenplay adaption developed from the novel. The novel ends with the Gemini Killer summoning Kinderman to his cell for a final speech and then willingly dropping dead after his alcoholic, abusive father Karl, a Christian evangelist, dies a natural death from a heart attack. As his motive for the killing was always to shame his father, the Gemini Killer's purpose for remaining on Earth no longer exists and he kills Karras in order to leave his host body. In Blatty's original screenplay adaptation, the ending is similar to the novel except that the Gemini Killer's death is not self-induced but forced supernaturally and suddenly by Karl's sudden death. In both novel and early screenplay, the Gemini Killer's motives for his murders are also given further context via a long series of flashbacks that portray his and his brother Thomas' childhood and their relationship with Karl.

== Release ==
The Exorcist III was first released in October 1989 in the European MIFED (Mercato internazionale del film e del documentario) Film Market and then opened in 1,288 theaters in the United States on August 17, 1990. Unlike its predecessors, it was distributed by 20th Century Fox instead of Warner Bros. (though some distribution rights would later revert to Warner). The film was released only a month before the Exorcist parody Repossessed, starring Linda Blair and Leslie Nielsen. Blair claimed that Exorcist III was rush-released ahead of Repossessed, hijacking the latter's publicity and forcing the comedy to be released a month later than was originally intended.

=== Critical response ===
As of April 2026, review aggregate website Rotten Tomatoes reported that 60% of critics gave the film positive write-ups based on 47 reviews. The critical consensus reads: "The Exorcist III is a talky, literary sequel with some scary moments that rival anything from the original." Audiences surveyed by CinemaScore gave the film a grade "C" on scale of A to F.

British film critic Mark Kermode called it "a restrained, haunting chiller which stimulates the adrenaline and intellect alike", and The New York Times reviewer Vincent Canby said "The Exorcist III is a better and funnier (intentionally) movie than either of its predecessors." Critic Brian McKay of efilmcritic.com remarked that the movie is "not quite as chilling as the first story" yet "is at least a quality sequel", being worth watching but suffering from many "uneven" aspects. People writer Ralph Novak began his review with, "as a movie writer-director, William Peter Blatty is like David Lynch's good twin: he is eccentric, original, funny and daring, but he also has a sense of taste, pace, and restraint - which is by way of saying that this is one of the shrewdest, wittiest, most intense and most satisfying horror movies ever made".

Owen Gleiberman of Entertainment Weekly wrote: "If Part II sequels are generally disappointing, Part IIIs are often much, much worse. It can seem as if nothing is going on in them except dim murmurings about the original movie — murmurings that mostly remind you of what isn't being delivered." He additionally labeled The Exorcist III "an ash-gray disaster [that] has the feel of a nightmare catechism lesson, or a horror movie made by a depressed monk". In the British magazine Empire, film critic Kim Newman claimed that "the major fault in Exorcist III is the house-of-cards plot that is constantly collapsing." Kevin Thomas of the Los Angeles Times called The Exorcist III "a handsome, classy art film" that "doesn't completely work but offers much more than countless, less ambitious films".

=== Box office ===
The Exorcist III opened in first place in its opening weekend, earning $9,312,219 in the United States and Canada. It grossed a total of $26,098,824 in the United States and Canada and $18 million internationally for a total of $44 million worldwide. Blatty attributed its poor box office performance to the title imposed by Morgan Creek, having always intended for the film to retain the title of the novel. During development and production, the film went under various titles, including The Exorcist: 1990. Morgan Creek and Fox insisted on including the word Exorcist in the title, which producer Carter DeHaven and Blatty protested against:

I begged them when they were considering titles not to name it Exorcist anything -- because Exorcist II was a disaster beyond imagination. You can't call it Exorcist III, because people will shun the box office. But they went and named it Exorcist III. Then they called me after the third week when we were beginning to fade at the box office and they said 'We'll tell you the reason: it's gonna hurt, you're not gonna like this – the reason is Exorcist II'. I couldn't believe it! They had total amnesia about my warnings!

=== Awards and nominations ===
In 1991, the film won a Saturn Award from the Academy of Science Fiction, Fantasy & Horror Films, for Best Writing (William Peter Blatty) and was nominated for Best Supporting Actor (Brad Dourif) and Best Horror Film at the 17th Saturn Awards. George C. Scott was also nominated for a Golden Raspberry Award for Worst Actor but lost to Andrew Dice Clay for The Adventures of Ford Fairlane at the 11th Golden Raspberry Awards.

== Director's cut ==
Despite his misgivings about the studio-imposed reshoots, Blatty remarked on his pride in the finished version of Exorcist III: "It's still a superior film. And in my opinion, and excuse me if I utter heresy here, but for me... it's a more frightening film than The Exorcist." Blatty hoped to recover the deleted footage from the Morgan Creek vaults so that he might re-assemble the original cut of the film which he said was "rather different" from what was released, and a version of the film which fans of the Exorcist series have been clamoring for. In 2007, Blatty's wife Julie Witbrodt reported on a fan site that "my husband tells me that it is Morgan Creek's claim that they have lost all the footage, including an alternative opening scene, in which Kinderman views the body of Karras in the morgue, right after his fall down the steps." However, film critic Mark Kermode has stated that the search for the missing footage is "ongoing".

Some pictures (lobby cards, stills) show a few deleted scenes from Blatty's original cut of the film:

- An alternative opening scene in which Kinderman views the body of Karras in the morgue after his fall down the stairs in the ending of the first film. When Kinderman leaves the morgue, the heart monitor shows signs of life from the body of Karras.
- The aftermath of the death scene of the first murdered priest Father Tom Kanavan (Harry Carey Jr.), where his dead body is shown holding his severed head while sitting.
- A longer version of the scene where Kinderman talks with Father Riley (Lee Richardson) about the murders and when a demon face is shown on the statue of the saint. Originally, an unseen intruder cuts the statue's head and places a knife in its hand.
- The exhumation of Damien Karras' body in Jesuit cemetery. Later it is discovered that dead body is actually from Brother Fain, a Jesuit who was tending Karras's body and who disappeared 15 years ago. Although this scene is deleted, parts of it are used in a new ending where Patient X/Karras is buried.
- Blatty's original cut did not have Jason Miller as Karras/Patient X in it, and it had a different isolation cell for scenes in which Kinderman talked with Patient X/Gemini killer. Some promotional photos show Patient X and Kinderman talking in the original cell.
- New exorcism ending that Blatty had to film also had a small part deleted in which Karras/Patient X is morphing through many other faces. One theatrical trailer shows this deleted scene.

In March 2011, a fan edit called Legion appeared on the Internet, credited to a fan using the pseudonym Spicediver, which removed all exorcism elements and recreated the main story arc of the director's cut without the use of any lost footage. In 2012, cast member Dourif agreed to present a screening of the fan edit at the Mad Monster Party horror convention held in Charlotte, North Carolina, on March 25. Dourif introduced the film, and did a Q&A session with the audience afterwards.

In December 2015, Morgan Creek began hinting via its Twitter feed that the director's cut was discovered and would eventually be released. Blatty later wrote on his website: "[Morgan Creek] are planning a new Blu-ray of 'my cut'". On October 25, 2016, Scream Factory released a two-disc Collector's Edition of the film, including the supposedly lost footage. The website states: "We know that the biggest question you might have is: Will there be a 'Director's Cut' of the film? The answer is yes—but with some caveats. We are working on putting together a version that will be close to Blatty's original script using a mixture of various film and videotape sources that we have been provided with."

In speaking to the process of creating the Legion director's cut, Blu-ray producer Cliff MacMillan explains further as to the journey to get there and the outcome: "We conducted an exhaustive search through a pallet of film assets from the original shoot to re-create William Peter Blatty's intended vision. Unfortunately, that footage has been lost to time. To that end, we turned to VHS tapes of the film's dailies to assemble the director's cut. However, even some of that footage was incomplete, so scenes from the theatrical re-shoot were used to fill in the gaps. This director's cut is a composite of varying footage quality from the best available sources."

== Legacy ==
The film became a focal point of the trial of serial killer Jeffrey Dahmer. Detectives testified that Dahmer claimed to identify with the Gemini Killer and would play the film for some of his victims before killing them. Dahmer's final attempted victim, Tracy Edwards, testified that Dahmer would rock back and forth while chanting at various times and that he especially enjoyed a sequence with a possessed Karras. Dahmer went so far as to purchase yellow contact lenses to more resemble Miller, as well as to emulate another film character he admired, Emperor Palpatine (Ian McDiarmid) from Return of the Jedi (1983).

=== Video game ===
An episodic video game adaptation exclusive to virtual reality, titled The Exorcist: Legion VR, was developed by Wolf & Wood, Ltd. and published by Fun Train for Steam VR, Meta Quest (formerly Oculus) and PlayStation VR headsets in 2018. The game is loosely based on the premise and events of The Exorcist III. The player character is an unnamed detective in a role similar to Kinderman's, venturing through horror environments and encountering demonic entities. However, while the first episode features a similar church crime scene to the film, the remaining episodes are standalone stories diverging from Blatty's narrative.
