= Elsewhere (Blatty novel) =

Novel by William Peter Blatty

- Trade Hardcover
- Author: William Peter Blatty
- Cover artist: Bruce Haley
- Language: English
- Genre: Horror
- Publisher: Cemetery Dance Publications
- Publication date: May 15, 2009
- Publication place: United States
- Media type: Print (hardback)
- Pages: 220 (original hardcover)
- ISBN: 1-58767-083-6
- OCLC: 310401734

Elsewhere is a novel by William Peter Blatty, released on May 15, 2009 through Cemetery Dance Publications. It was originally published as a novella in 1999 in Al Sarrantonio's 999: New Stories of Horror and Suspense anthology.

Elsewhere is studied in the 2008 publication American Exorcist: Critical Essays on William Peter Blatty. The story follows a group of people who visit a supposedly haunted house. When other secrets appear, the group tries to find out what else the house has that is secret.

== Plot ==
Joan Freeboard, a Realtor, has been assigned to sell Elsewhere, a house notorious for being haunted. She brings along her friend Terrence Dare, a writer, and psychic Anna Trawley to help investigate. When they arrive at the house, they met up with paranormal investigator Gabriel Case. It is suggested that something is wrong with Gabriel Case; he acts as if he has met the group before, saying, "here you all are again", even though this is supposedly his first time meeting the group.

Gabriel Case then tells them that a doctor who once lived at Elsewhere killed his young wife and himself, both becoming the ghosts of the house. Gabriel also introduces his servant. It is evident that something is going on between the two because, after an argument between Terrence and Joan, Gabriel Case tells the servant, "See she forgives him."

As the group stays at Elsewhere, things get even stranger. Terrence opens a door to find a family and two priests who throw holy water at him, burning him. When Anna and Joan go for a walk, they notice they can no longer see any lights coming from the city even though it is just across from the island. The group then holds a séance where strange paranormal events occur.

Terrence sees a dog even though there are no dogs at Elsewhere, and a spirit spells out words for them on a Ouija board. Terrance also has trouble remembering if he brought his dogs along with him, and the other members of the group get strangely confused when he asks them. In the story's climax, a paranormal entity attacks Joan and Terrence while they're in a room together, banging on the door furiously as it tries to get inside.

When Anna and Gabriel return from a stroll on the beach, Joan and Terrence tell them what happened and Gabriel suggest they watch the video tapes from the cameras to see what happened. There are no paranormal events on the cameras and one of the group members then notices the dates on the camera are wrong. When they go back downstairs they are all killed by an invisible entity—except for Gabriel who watches them get killed with a rather calm look on his face.

The book then skips back to the beginning, only this time the characters realize events are repeating themselves. Gabriel then explains that the three died on their way to Elsewhere and that in refusing to go on they haunted the place, living in an endless cycle. Gabriel was then tasked to watch over them until they became aware of this cycle. The family and priests Terrence saw were the current owners of the house who had hired the priests to get rid of the ghosts. Gabriel then tells them that they are now able to go on and Joan and Terrence walk on to the afterlife where Terrence is reunited with his dogs. Anna Trawley eventually allows herself to be led by Gabriel to the afterlife. When she asks why he lied about the whole thing he tells her "ghost lie".

Meanwhile, back at the house, the current owners are happy the ghosts are gone. It is revealed that Gabriel and the Servant were actually the doctor and his wife who had haunted the house before Joan, Terrence, and Anna showed up. One of the priests notices a painting on the wall of the house that looks a lot like his partner. While walking down the beach, the priests begin talking and one of them turns to the other, "but there was nobody there".

== Characters ==
Joan Freeboard – a realtor assigned to sell Elsewhere, it is her that gathers the group together. She is very stubborn and has a no-nonsense personality, but is also described by Terrence as being vulnerable. Due to her stubborn personality she is the last to accept the haunting of Elsewhere.

Terrence Dare – a writer, and one of Joan's best friends, he was brought along to write an article about the haunting of Elsewhere. Out of the entire group it is him that reacts the strongest to the paranormal events that go on at Elsewhere. A Catholic that has renounced his faith, Gabriel suggest this is why Terrence was the one who saw the priests at Elsewhere.

Anna Trawley – a psychic that gained her powers in a car accident that killed her daughter, she is very much aware of the haunting of Elsewhere. While there she keeps a journal of the events that go on there, and many of the events are ones the others are not aware of.

Gabriel Case – although he passes himself off as a paranormal investigator for much of the book, he is actually the ghost of the doctor that murdered his wife and haunted Elsewhere. He was tasked with watching over the group until they became aware they were trapped in a seemingly endless cycle.

== Edition ==
The book was published in three versions:

- Trade Edition bound in full-cloth with full-color dust jacket artwork
- Slipcased Limited Edition of 350 signed and numbered copies
- Traycased Lettered Edition of 52 signed and lettered copies bound in leather with satin ribbon page marker
