= William Peter Blatty =

American writer and filmmaker (1928–2017)

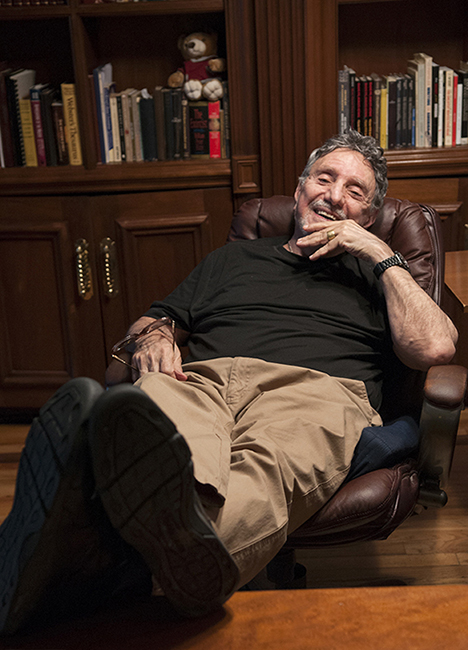
- Blatty in 2009
- Born: January 7, 1928; New York City, U.S.
- Died: January 12, 2017 (aged 89); Bethesda, Maryland, U.S.
- Education: Georgetown University (BA); George Washington University (MA)
- Occupations: Novelist; screenwriter; film director
- Spouses: Mary Margaret Rigard (m. 1950; div. 1963); Elizabeth Gilman (m. 1965; div. 1971); Linda Tuero (m. 1975; div. 1980); Julie Witbrodt (m. 1983)
- Children: 7; including J. T. Blatty
- Relatives: Germanos Mouakkad (great-uncle); Mika (second nephew)
- Writing career
- Genres: Horror; drama; comedy

William Peter Blatty (January 7, 1928 – January 12, 2017) was a Lebanese American writer, director and producer. He is best known for his 1971 novel The Exorcist and for his screenplay for the 1973 film adaptation. Blatty won the Academy Award for Best Adapted Screenplay for The Exorcist, and was nominated for Best Picture as its producer. The film also earned Blatty a Golden Globe Award for Best Motion Picture – Drama as producer.

Born and raised in New York City, Blatty received his bachelor's degree in English from Georgetown University in 1950, and his master's degree in English literature from the George Washington University. Following completion of his master's degree in 1954, he joined the United States Air Force and served in the Psychological Warfare Division where he attained the rank of first lieutenant. After service in the air force, he worked for the United States Information Agency in Beirut.

After the success of The Exorcist, Blatty reworked his 1966 novel Twinkle, Twinkle, "Killer" Kane! into a new novel titled The Ninth Configuration, published in 1978. He went on to adapt the novel into the 1980 film, which was also his directorial debut. At the 38th Golden Globe Awards, the film won Best Screenplay and was nominated for Best Picture.

Blatty refused to have any involvement with the first sequel to The Exorcist (1973); the film was critically panned. He directed the second sequel, The Exorcist III (1990), which he adapted from his 1983 novel Legion. His second film as a director, The Exorcist III was his final directorial credit and final screenplay credit. Some of his later novels include Elsewhere (2009), Dimiter (2010) and Crazy (2010).

== Early life ==
Blatty was born on January 7, 1928, in New York City. He was the fifth and youngest child of Lebanese immigrants, Mary (née Mouakad; Arabic: ماري معقد بلاتي), a devout Melkite Catholic and the niece of bishop Germanos Mouakkad, and Peter Blatty (Arabic: بيتر بلاتي), a cloth cutter. His parents separated when he was a toddler. He was raised in what he described as "comfortable destitution" by his deeply religious mother, whose sole support came from peddling homemade quince jelly in the streets of Manhattan; she once offered a jar of it to Franklin D. Roosevelt when the President was cutting the ribbon for the Queens–Midtown Tunnel, telling him, "For when you have company." He lived at 28 different addresses during his childhood because of nonpayment of rent. "We never lived at the same address in New York for longer than two or three months at a time," Blatty told The Washington Post in 1972. "Eviction was the order of the day." Blatty's mother died in 1967.

He attended Brooklyn Preparatory, a Jesuit school, on a scholarship and graduated as class valedictorian in 1946. He later attended Georgetown University on a scholarship, where he earned his bachelor's degree in English in 1950. "Those years at Georgetown were probably the best years of my life," Blatty said in 2015. "Until then, I'd never had a home." While studying for his master's degree at George Washington University, Blatty took menial jobs. Initially unable to find a job in teaching, he worked as a vacuum-cleaner door-to-door salesman, a beer-truck driver, and as a United Airlines ticket agent. He earned his master's in English literature from the George Washington University in 1954. He then joined the United States Air Force.

Mustering out of the Air Force, he joined the United States Information Agency and worked as an editor based in Beirut, Lebanon. Eventually, his writing talent emerged, and he began submitting humorous articles to magazines.

He was the second uncle of singer Mika.

== Career ==
In the late 1950s, Blatty worked as the public relations director at Loyola University of Los Angeles and as a publicity director at the University of Southern California. He published his first book, Which Way to Mecca, Jack? in 1960, a humorous look at both his early life, and his work at the United States Information Agency in Lebanon. The book also tells of his successful masquerade as a Saudi Arabian prince when he got to Los Angeles. In 1961, while still pretending to be a prince, Blatty appeared as a contestant on the Groucho Marx quiz show You Bet Your Life, winning $10,000, enough money to quit his job and to write full-time. Thereafter, he never held a regular job.

He then published the comic novels: John Goldfarb, Please Come Home! (1963), I, Billy Shakespeare (1965) and Twinkle, Twinkle, "Killer" Kane (1966). He achieved critical success with these books – Marvin Levin in the New York Times, for example, wrote: "Nobody can write funnier lines than William Peter Blatty, a gifted virtuoso who writes like [S. J.] Perelman"; but significant sales were lacking. It was at this point that Blatty began a collaboration with director Blake Edwards, writing scripts for comedy films such as: A Shot in the Dark (1964), What Did You Do in the War, Daddy? (1966), Gunn (1967) and Darling Lili (1970), a musical starring Julie Andrews and Rock Hudson. Blatty also worked on his own using the name "Bill Blatty" writing comedy screenplays such as those for the Danny Kaye film The Man from the Diners' Club (1963), and the Warren Beatty/Leslie Caron film Promise Her Anything (1965). Other screenplays include the film adaptation of John Goldfarb, Please Come Home! (1965), and The Great Bank Robbery (1969).

Later Blatty resumed writing fiction. In 1971, he wrote The Exorcist, the story of a twelve-year-old girl possessed by a powerful demon, that topped The New York Times Best Seller list for 17 weeks and remained on the list for 57 consecutive weeks. The book sold more than 13 million copies in the United States alone and was translated into over a dozen languages. He later adapted it with director William Friedkin into the film version. Blatty went on to win the Academy Award for his Exorcist screenplay, as well as Golden Globes for Best Picture and Best Writing. It also became the first horror film ever to be nominated for the Academy Award for Best Picture.

In 1978, Blatty adapted his novel Twinkle, Twinkle, "Killer" Kane into a new book titled The Ninth Configuration, and in 1980 he wrote, directed, and produced a film version, which focused on the question of the existence of God. The film was a commercial flop despite critical acclaim. Movie critic Jerry Stein called it a "masterpiece" in The Cincinnati Post, and Peter Travers described it as "the finest large-scale American surrealist film ever made" in People magazine. At the 38th Golden Globe Awards in 1981 it was nominated for three Golden Globes, and won the Best Writing Award against competition that included The Elephant Man (1980), Ordinary People (1980) and Raging Bull (1980).

In 1983, Blatty wrote Legion, a sequel to The Exorcist which later became the basis of the film The Exorcist III. At first he was unable to set up the production because he wanted to direct the film. Blatty's agent, Steve Jaffe, helped package the project with producer Carter DeHaven at Morgan Creek Productions. Blatty directed the film. He originally wanted the movie version to be titled Legion, but the film's producers wanted it to be more closely linked to the original. Blatty sued the New York Times Book Review for failing to include Legion in its best-seller list.

The first sequel, Exorcist II: The Heretic (1977), was disappointing both critically and commercially. Blatty had no involvement with it and his own follow-up ignored it entirely.

Blatty's son Peter Vincent Blatty died from a rare heart disorder in 2006 at the age of 19. His death was the subject of Blatty's non-fiction book that is "part comic memoir, part argument for life after death", titled, Finding Peter: A True Story of the Hand of Providence and Evidence of Life After Death (2015).

In 2011, The Exorcist was re-released in a 40th Anniversary Edition in paperback, hardcover and audiobook formats with new cover artwork. As described by Blatty, this new, updated edition features new and revised material.

The 40th Anniversary Edition of The Exorcist will have a touch of new material in it as part of an all-around polish of the dialogue and prose. First time around I never had the time (meaning the funds) to do a second draft, and this, finally, is it. With forty years to think about it, a few little changes were inevitable—plus one new character in a totally new very spooky scene. This is the version I would like to be remembered for.

Tor/Forge have also re-published The Ninth Configuration and Legion, with new, updated cover artwork.

The Exorcist was eventually adapted into a stage play starring Richard Chamberlain and Brooke Shields in 2012 and a sequel TV series starring Geena Davis was produced in 2016.

== Personal life ==
Blatty married four times and had seven children. With his first wife, Mary Margaret Rigard, whom he married on February 18, 1950, he had three children: Christine Ann, Michael Peter and Mary Joanne. His first marriage ended in divorce after 13 years. His second wife was Elizabeth Gilman, whom he married in 1965. The marriage ended in divorce in 1971. In 1975 he married his third wife, tennis professional Linda Tuero, with whom he had two children: restaurant entrepreneur Billy and photojournalist J. T. Blatty. The marriage ended in divorce in 1980. Following the dissolution of his first three marriages, Blatty married Julie Alicia Witbrodt, his fourth wife, in 1983, with whom he had two children. The couple remained together until Blatty's death. After residing for many years in Hollywood and Aspen, Blatty settled in Bethesda, Maryland in 2000.

Blatty was a Roman Catholic. In 2012, he filed a canon law petition against his alma mater, Georgetown University, which he said has been at variance with Catholic Church teaching for decades, inviting speakers who support abortion rights and disobeying Pope John Paul II's instructions issued to Church-affiliated colleges and universities in 1990. The Vatican rejected the petition in 2014. In the Vatican's response to Blatty, Archbishop Angelo Zani stated that the rejection was because Blatty had not "suffered an objective change" at Georgetown's hands, but acknowledged that Blatty's case constituted "a well-founded complaint".

=== Death ===
Blatty died of multiple myeloma on January 12, 2017, at a hospital in Bethesda, five days after his 89th birthday.

== Critical studies ==
Studies of Blatty's work include G. S. J. Barclay's Anatomy of Horror: The Masters of Occult Fiction. Critical essays on Blatty's work include Douglas E. Winter's essay in A Dark Night's Dreaming: Contemporary American Horror Fiction, and S. T. Joshi's essay "William Peter Blatty: The Catholic Weird Tale" in The Modern Weird Tale: A Critique of Horror Fiction (2001). Essays studying all Blatty's novels can be found in Benjamin Szumskyj's American Exorcist: Critical Essays on William Peter Blatty (McFarland, 2008).

== Awards ==
Awards include:

- The Commonwealth Club Silver Medal for Literature (The Exorcist)
- Won the 2000 Audie Awards award for Narration by the Author for The Exorcist.
- The Gabriel Award and American Film Festival Blue Ribbon for Insight TV series episode "Watts Made Out of Thread?"
- Saturn Awards for The Exorcist, The Ninth Configuration and The Exorcist III
- The People's Choice Award for the Oscars – Best Picture Award for The Exorcist
- The Horror Writers Association Lifetime Achievement Award
- Academy Award, Best Adapted Screenplay (The Exorcist)
- Golden Globe, Best Screenplay (The Ninth Configuration)
- Golden Globe, Best Picture (The Exorcist)
- Golden Globe, Best Screenplay (The Exorcist)

== Bibliography ==
=== Novels ===
- Which Way to Mecca, Jack? (1959)
- John Goldfarb, Please Come Home! (1963)
- I, Billy Shakespeare (1965)
- Twinkle, Twinkle, "Killer" Kane (1966)
- The Exorcist (1971)
- The Ninth Configuration (1978)
- Legion (1983)
- Demons Five, Exorcists Nothing: A Fable (1996)/Revised and re-released in 2013, retitled Demons Five, Exorcists Nothing: A Hollywood Christmas Carol
- Elsewhere (2009) – Originally published as a novella in 1999 in Al Sarrantonio's 999: New Stories of Horror and Suspense anthology
- Dimiter (2010) / Revised and re-released in 2013; also published under the title The Redemption
- Crazy (2010)
- The Exorcist for the 21st Century (2016)

=== Autobiography ===
- Blatty, William Peter (1974). I'll Tell Them I Remember You. Barrie & Jenkins. ISBN 978-0-214-20016-8.

=== Nonfiction ===
- Blatty, William Peter (1974). William Peter Blatty on 'The Exorcist': From Novel to Screen. Bantam Books. ISBN 0-553-08687-1.
- Blatty, William Peter (2001). If There Were Demons Then Perhaps There Were Angels: William Peter Blatty's Own Story of the Exorcist. Screenpress Books. ISBN 1-901680-34-7.
- Blatty, William Peter (2015). Finding Peter: A True Story of The Hand of Providence and Evidence of Life After Death. Regnery Publishing. ISBN 978-1-62157-332-6.

== Filmography ==
Title	Year	Credited as			Notes	Ref(s)
Title	Year	Director	Screenwriter	Producer	Notes	Ref(s)
The Man from the Diners' Club	1963	No	Yes	No		
A Shot in the Dark	1964	No	Yes	No		
John Goldfarb, Please Come Home!	1965	No	Yes	No		
Promise Her Anything	1965	No	Yes	No		
What Did You Do in the War, Daddy?	1966	No	Yes	No		
Gunn	1967	No	Yes	No		
The Great Bank Robbery	1969	No	Yes	No		
Darling Lili	1970	No	Yes	No		
The Exorcist	1973	No	Yes	Yes		
Mastermind	1976	No	Yes	No	Credited as "Terence Clyne"	
The Ninth Configuration	1980	Yes	Yes	Yes		
The Exorcist III	1990	Yes	Yes	No		

== See also ==
- List of horror fiction writers
