= The Ninth Configuration =

1980 film by William Peter Blatty

- Theatrical release poster
- Directed by: William Peter Blatty
- Written by: William Peter Blatty
- Based on: The Ninth Configuration by William Peter Blatty
- Produced by: William Peter Blatty
- Starring: Stacy Keach; Scott Wilson; Jason Miller; Ed Flanders; Neville Brand; George DiCenzo; Moses Gunn
- Cinematography: Gerry Fisher
- Edited by: Battle Davis; Tony de Zarraga; Peter Lee-Thompson; Roberto Silvi
- Music by: Barry De Vorzon
- Production company: The Ninth Configuration Company
- Distributed by: Warner Bros.
- Release date: February 29, 1980
- Running time: 118 minutes
- Country: United States
- Language: English
- Budget: $2.5 million

The Ninth Configuration (also known as Twinkle, Twinkle, "Killer" Kane) is a 1980 American surrealist psychological drama film written, produced, and directed by William Peter Blatty, in his directorial debut. It is the second installment in Blatty's "Trilogy of Faith" after The Exorcist (1973), and followed by The Exorcist III (1990). The film is based on Blatty's 1978 novel The Ninth Configuration, which was itself a reworking of his 1966 novel Twinkle, Twinkle, "Killer" Kane!.

The first half of the film has the predominant tone and style of a comic farce. In the second half, the film becomes darker as it delves deeper into its central issues of human suffering, sacrifice and faith. The film also frequently blurs the line between the sane and insane. The film received positive reviews from critics, and was recognized with the Golden Globe Award for Best Screenplay and two other nominations at the 38th Golden Globe Awards.

== Plot ==
In the early 1970s, towards the end of the Vietnam War, a castle in the Pacific Northwest is used by the US government as an insane asylum for military personnel. Among the patients is former astronaut Billy Cutshaw, who aborted a Moon launch and was dragged screaming from the capsule, suffering from an apparent mental breakdown.

Colonel Hudson Kane, a former member of a Marine Corps special operations unit, arrives at the castle to take over the treatment of the patients. Colonel Fell helps Kane acclimatise himself to the eccentricities of the patients. Kane eventually talks to Cutshaw, who refuses to answer why he did not want to go to the Moon. Instead, he gives Kane a St. Christopher medal. Lieutenant Reno, who is there attempting to stage Shakespeare plays with a cast of dogs, suspects that Kane is crazy himself.

Meanwhile, Kane constantly has nightmares of his brother Vincent, a former patient and murderer who is now dead. Cutshaw talks with Kane again, and they debate God and the idea of a divine plan. Kane, who believes that the existence of a God is far more likely than humanity's having emerged from "random chance", argues that deeds of pure self-sacrifice are proof of human goodness, which can only be explained by divine purpose. Cutshaw demands that Kane recall one concrete example of pure self-sacrifice from his personal experience; Kane is unable. Kane takes Cutshaw to a church service, which Cutshaw interrupts with several outbursts, and Kane momentarily hallucinates. After returning to the castle, Cutshaw thanks Kane and asks him to send him a sign as proof of an afterlife should Kane die first. Kane promises to try.

Kane then meets with a new patient who calls him "Killer Kane". Kane flashes back to Vietnam, where he killed a young boy. The soldier urges Kane to leave, and he screams. In the present, Kane collapses, unconscious. Fell explains to the staff that Kane is Vincent "Killer" Kane and suffered a breakdown in Vietnam. When Fell, who is Kane's brother Hudson, was dispatched back to America, Kane received the dispatch by accident. Kane created a new persona for himself – a healer, like his brother. Subconsciously hoping to heal people to make up for his "murders", Kane returned to the US as his brother. Realizing Kane's mental state, the Army psychiatric staff maintained the charade and sent him to Fell's hospital under the pretext of being its commanding officer. In reality, Fell has been the commanding officer all along. Kane awakens and remembers nothing of the incident.

Cutshaw escapes the castle and visits a bar. A biker gang recognizes Cutshaw from news reports and brutalizes him. A waitress contacts the hospital, and Kane arrives to retrieve Cutshaw. Kane humbles himself to the bikers to extricate Cutshaw, but the bikers are disgusted by his behavior and assault him. The gang attempts to rape Cutshaw, causing Kane to snap and kill most of them with his bare hands.

Kane and Cutshaw return to the castle, and the police arrive to arrest Kane for the murders at the bar. Fell interjects and tells the police officers that Kane must stay because he was provoked. Cutshaw later visits Kane. Dreamy and distant, Kane mumbles to Cutshaw about God and proof of human goodness before passing out. Cutshaw reveals that he did not want to go to the Moon because he was terrified of being alone in space. Cutshaw's admission appears to resurrect some lucidity within himself. As Cutshaw leaves, Kane's hand drops a bloodied knife. Outside Kane's room, Cutshaw notices blood on his shoe. Rushing back in, Cutshaw discovers that Kane had actually been injured in the bar fight and refused to get help, effectively committing suicide to provide proof of human goodness.

Some time later, Cutshaw returns to uniform and visits the now-abandoned castle. After reading a note left by Kane, which expresses hope that his sacrifice will shock Cutshaw back to sanity, Cutshaw finds a Saint Christopher's medal has somehow appeared in his car. He turns it over to confirm whether it was the one he gave to Kane and silently rejoices at what he sees.

== Cast ==
- Stacy Keach as Colonel Vincent Kane
- Scott Wilson as Captain Billy Cutshaw
- Jason Miller as Lieutenant Frankie Reno
- Ed Flanders as Colonel Richard Fell
- Neville Brand as Major Marvin Groper
- George DiCenzo as Captain Fairbanks
- Moses Gunn as Major Nammack
- Robert Loggia as Lieutenant Bennish
- Joe Spinell as Lieutenant Spinell
- Alejandro Rey as Lieutenant Gomez
- Tom Atkins as Sergeant Krebs
- Steve Sandor as 1st Cyclist
- Richard Lynch as 2nd Cyclist
- William Peter Blatty as Lieutenant Fromme

== Background ==
William Peter Blatty's novel Twinkle, Twinkle, "Killer" Kane! was first published in 1966. Blatty said: "I considered it a comic novel, but a great deal of philosophy and theology crept into it. But the farcical elements outweighed the serious elements." Blatty adapted the novel into a screenplay, and intended for it to be filmed by William Friedkin. Blatty said that the script "was what you might call bizarre material. I had hoped to direct it myself. But after seeing The Night They Raided Minsky's I thought the script would be safe with Friedkin. I sent it along to him. He liked it. But we couldn't find a studio that liked it." Blatty and Friedkin would later collaborate on the film version of The Exorcist (1973), with Blatty as screenwriter/producer and Friedkin as director, before Blatty returned to Twinkle, Twinkle, "Killer" Kane! In lieu of filming the novel, Blatty decided to rewrite it: "After The Exorcist, I decided that I could develop the story a great deal. So I rewrote it and fleshed it out, Cutshaw became the astronaut in The Exorcist that Regan warns about going into outer space and fully developed the deeper implications and theological themes." The rewritten version of Twinkle, Twinkle, "Killer" Kane! was published in 1978 under the title The Ninth Configuration.

In his introduction to the 1978 novel, Blatty wrote:

When I was young and worked very hastily and from need, I wrote a novel called Twinkle, Twinkle, Killer Kane! Its basic concept was surely the best I have ever created, but what was published was surely no more than the notes for a novel – some sketches, unformed, unfinished, lacking even a plot. But the idea mattered to me, so once again I have written a novel based on it. This time I know it is the best that I can do.

However, Blatty subsequently stated he preferred the first version of the book to the second: "... the first one is infinitely funnier and wilder, and stranger and more of a one of a kind; the second one has the same plot, but the prose is more finely crafted, I think. In the first one I allowed the comedy to carry me, so I think I prefer that one ... I loved the characters and it was a pleasure to write."

Blatty then developed The Ninth Configuration into a screenplay for Columbia Pictures (Blatty did not want to work with Warner Bros. Pictures as he had sued that studio over his proper share of profits from The Exorcist). Columbia then placed the screenplay in turnaround; Blatty took the script to Universal Pictures. Universal rejected it; according to Blatty, this was "not because of any consideration of quality, but simply because Columbia had let it go. There was nobody prepared to take a chance on their own judgement."

With no major film studio prepared to fund The Ninth Configuration, Blatty decided to raise the film's $4 million budget by putting up half the money himself and persuading the PepsiCo conglomerate to provide the remaining $2 million. As writer/director of the film, Blatty was promised complete creative control over the production by PepsiCo with only one stipulation: that the film had to be shot in Hungary (PepsiCo had blocked funds in that country, and reinvested money from the film's production into a Pepsi bottling plant there). Ironically, Warner Bros. wound up initially releasing the film in selected markets, despite Blatty's misgivings.

== Casting ==
Blatty retained Jason Miller, who had played Father Karras in The Exorcist, for The Ninth Configuration. Ed Flanders (once considered for the role of Karras in The Exorcist) was also cast; Michael Moriarty was set to play Captain Billy Cutshaw but dropped out of the production (he was replaced by Scott Wilson, who was originally cast as Fairbanks). For the central role of Colonel Kane, Blatty cast Stacy Keach (another contender for the part of Father Karras in The Exorcist). Blatty had originally cast Nicol Williamson in the role of Kane, before deciding that the British actor was wrong for the part: "I was deluding myself. I so desperately admired [Williamson] and wanted him in my picture that I persuaded myself that he could be an American Marine corps colonel. I realised during rehearsals. He was magnificent, but there was no way he could be an American colonel. He came to Budapest and we rehearsed for two weeks. And we were coming up to the weekend before our first shoot on the following Monday, and then I remembered one of the people I'd strongly considered was Stacy Keach. And we found out that night that he was available and he was with us on Tuesday." Stacy Keach recalls the situation differently: "Ironically, I was the lucky benefactor of a Nicol tantrum in the late '70s. William Peter Blatty had cast him as Killer Kane in The Ninth Configuration (also known as Twinkle, Twinkle, Killer Kane), and the film was being shot in Budapest, Hungary. Nicol was staying at the Budapest Hilton, and was allegedly trying to make an international phone call when, presumably, something the operator did or said infuriated him, causing him to rip the phone out of the wall and toss it through the plate-glass window of his suite. Nicol was fired, and I was hired to play the role. It was a great part, and I often reflected on how Nicol would have played certain moments during the filming. I have no doubts that he would have been brilliant, as he always was. We became friends for a time, and I loved his company."

Tom Atkins had a minor role in the film, and in an interview in January 2009, he discussed what the film shoot was like: "I have always believed that a movie about the making of that film would have been much better than the actual movie turned out to be. It was kind of a zoo from the very beginning. William Peter Blatty wrote and directed it and financed part of it by selling a home that he had in Malibu. His idea of getting a good ensemble effort from his actors was to take people over to Budapest for two months—the part I had might have taken two weeks in the States but he had us all over there for two months. All he ended up getting was 22 really upset, angry and drunk actors who had a lot of trouble showing up for work. I thought that the script was wonderful but I don’t think that Blatty ever got what he wanted up on the screen. I think a lot of us took the job because we would be able to go to Prague and Moscow and bounce around Europe when we weren’t working. He decided that he would put up the call sheet for the next day at midnight so that you couldn’t go anywhere."

Blatty himself appears briefly near the start of the film as a patient pretending to be an army doctor (he is the one who stole Ed Flanders' pants; the role was originally intended for George DiCenzo, but once Michael Moriarty dropped out, DiCenzo was given the role of Fairbanks, originally intended for Scott Wilson, and Blatty decided to fill the role himself), and would later cast Jason Miller, Ed Flanders, Scott Wilson, George DiCenzo and Nicol Williamson in his next film as writer/director, The Exorcist III (1990).

General release poster of the film as Twinkle, Twinkle, "Killer" Kane

== Release and reception ==
United Film Distribution (UFD), affiliated with the United Artists theatre chain and best known for releasing George A. Romero's Dawn of the Dead, picked up the film for a planned December 1979 release; however, the company dropped the picture, and Warner Bros. subsequently picked it up. After initially poor box office returns in its test markets, Warner Bros. returned the film to Blatty and allowed him to take it to another distributor. UFD re-acquired the rights and released it in other markets under the title Twinkle, Twinkle, "Killer" Kane. It was not a commercial success upon its cinematic release in 1980; however, it received generally strong reviews and a Best Picture nomination at the 38th Golden Globe Awards in January 1981. Although the film did not win, Blatty did win a Golden Globe for the film's screenplay. Blatty re-edited the film for its 1985 re-release, which was distributed by New World Pictures under the original title, The Ninth Configuration.

On review aggregator Rotten Tomatoes, The Ninth Configuration has an approval rating of 80% based on 15 reviews, with an average rating of 7/10. Leonard Maltin has described the movie as "hilarious yet thought-provoking, with endlessly quotable dialogue and an amazing barroom fight scene." Blatty's screenplay was later published in 2000 with commentary by English film critic Mark Kermode (Kermode also contributed to the audio commentary and featurette on the film's DVD release in 2002). Kermode has described The Ninth Configuration as "a breathtaking cocktail of philosophy, eye-popping visuals, jaw-dropping pretentiousness, rib-tickling humour and heart-stopping action. From exotically hallucinogenic visions of a lunar crucifixion to the claustrophobic realism of a bar-room brawl, via such twisted vignettes as Robert Loggia karaoking to Al Jolson and Moses Gunn in Superman drag (don't ask), Blatty directs like a man with no understanding of, or interest in, the supposed limits of mainstream movie-making. The result is a work of matchless madness which divides audiences as spectacularly as the waves of the Red Sea, a cult classic that continues to provoke either apostolic devotion or baffled dismissal 20 years on."

=== Awards and nominations ===
- 38th Golden Globe Awards
  - Best Film – Drama – Nomination
  - Best Supporting Actor – Scott Wilson – Nomination
  - Best Screenplay – William Peter Blatty – WON
- Saturn Awards
  - Best Screenplay – William Peter Blatty – WON
  - Best Fantasy Film – Nomination

== Alternate versions ==
Several versions of The Ninth Configuration were released in cinemas and on video tape and DVD (one version retained the title Twinkle, Twinkle, "Killer" Kane). In the original theatrical release and the Blatty-endorsed DVD, it is the intention that Kane killed himself with the knife. In some versions released during the intervening years, an alternate ending was used in which it is said (via added voiceover by Stacy Keach) that Kane died of wounds inflicted by the bikers.

== 2016 remastered edition ==
The UK company Second Sight Films and the USA company Shout! Factory remastered this film in April 2016 for DVD and Blu-ray. It featured an added memorial dedication to Blatty's late son, Peter Vincent Blatty, who died in 2006 from a rare heart disorder. The dedication also mistakenly had the theme from the first two logos of Lorimar Television in a high pitch (due to a NTSC-to-PAL conversion) playing over it.

== Legacy ==
The Ninth Configuration is believed to be the first appearance of the popular "Howie Scream" stock sound effect, which is also well known in the Howie Long character's death scene in the 1996 film Broken Arrow and the scream heard in the Starcraft video game when the Terran Academy building is selected, among many other use cases.
