= Legion (Blatty novel) =

1983 novel by William Peter Blatty

- Trade hardcover
- Author: William Peter Blatty
- Language: English
- Genre: Horror
- Publisher: Simon & Schuster
- Publication date: 1983
- Publication place: United States
- Media type: Print (hardback)
- Pages: 248 (original hardcover)
- ISBN: 0-671-47045-0
- OCLC: 9392479
- Dewey Decimal: 813/.54 19
- LC Class: PS3552.L392 L4 1983
- Preceded by: The Exorcist

Legion is a 1983 horror novel by American writer William Peter Blatty. A sequel to The Exorcist, it also involves demonic possession and was adapted for the film The Exorcist III in 1990. The book was the focus of a court case over its exclusion from The New York Times Best Seller list. Blatty based aspects of the Gemini Killer on the real-life Zodiac Killer, who in a January 1974 letter to the San Francisco Chronicle had praised the original Exorcist film as "the best satirical comedy that I have ever seen".

== Title ==
The title is derived from the Bible. The Gospel of Luke describes Jesus traveling in the land of Gadarenes, where he encounters a man possessed by demons:

Jesus asked him, saying, "What is your name?" And he said, "Legion", because many devils had entered him. (Luke 8:30)

The more common quotation of the incident, sometimes called the Gerasene Demoniac, comes from The Gospel of Mark:

And he asked him, "What is thy name?" And he answered, saying, "My name is Legion: for we are many". (Mark 5:9)

== Premise ==
The storyline of the novel mixes horror and whodunnit. Police Lieutenant Bill Kinderman (a returning character from The Exorcist), investigates a series of murders that have all the hallmarks of a long dead serial killer who was shot by police; the body was never recovered. The slayings have a blasphemous side to them, including a child being crucified and a priest's beheading. Kinderman's investigations lead him to a mental asylum, where there are a number of suspects, including a psychiatrist and one of his patients. There Kinderman begins to find links between the victims and events in the previous novel, the exorcism of the twelve-year-old girl, Regan.

Kinderman entertains philosophical thoughts, trying for instance to work out how the concept of evil relates to God's plans for humanity. Kinderman often alludes to his own favorite novel, Dostoevsky's The Brothers Karamazov, and both Shakespeare and Nietzsche influence the dialogues between him and a mysterious patient.

== Plot summary ==
A twelve-year-old boy is murdered and crucified on a pair of rowing oars. Kinderman already sees that he is mutilated in a way identical to the victims of the Gemini Killer, a serial killer who was apparently shot to death by police fifteen years previously while climbing the Golden Gate Bridge in San Francisco. A priest is later murdered in a confessional, once again bearing the mutilations distinctive of the killer. The fingerprints at the two crime scenes differ, however. Further victims soon follow, including one of Kinderman's friends, Father Dyer, (Note: From The Exorcist.) who is slain in a hospital by draining his body of blood. Yet again the Gemini Killer's mutilations are present.

Investigations lead Kinderman to the psychiatric wing of the hospital where his friend was slain. Here he finds suspects:

- Dr. Freeman Temple – a psychiatrist who has a contemptuous attitude towards his patients.
- Dr. Vincent Amfortas (Note: The name "Amfortas" is the name of the Fisher King in Richard Wagner's opera Parsifal, which itself is derived from "Anfortas", the name of the character of the Fisher King in the Middle High German medieval Grail romance Parzival, by Wolfram von Eschenbach. Dr. Amfortas, like his literary and operatic namesakes, is a type of the Wounded King or Maimed King, a role traditionally occupied by the character of the Fisher King in medieval romances related to the Holy Grail legend, whose literary and mythological roles are discussed in detail by Jessie Weston in her 1920 examination of the Grail tradition, From Ritual to Romance.) – he is not very talkative, and seemingly apathetic toward everything since the recent death of his wife.
- Patients – there are elderly people at the hospital with senile dementia. The fingerprints of different senile patients are found at murder scenes, but interviews with them make it clear they are seemingly incapable of carrying out the elaborate crimes.
- James Vennamun – the actual Killer himself, whose body was never found, suggesting that he may have survived and resumed his crimes.
- Tommy Sunlight – a patient, believed by Kinderman to be Damien Karras, a priest who supposedly died in The Exorcist by falling down a flight of stairs. He was found wandering aimlessly eleven years before, dressed as a priest. He brags of being James reincarnated and of having carried out the recent murders despite being secured in a locked cell in a straitjacket. At one point he claims the doctors and nurses let him out to kill.

Sunlight eventually tells Kinderman that the demon from the earlier novel aided him to possess the body of Damien Karras after the latter's death in an act of revenge for having been driven out of the little girl. Sunlight spent many years trying to gain control of the body, which had suffered from injuries, during which time Karras was held in a mental hospital. He lacked any identification and was nicknamed Sunlight because he sat in the sun's rays as it passed through the window of his cell. Upon gaining control of Karras' body, the Gemini occasionally left it to possess the bodies of the patients with senile dementia, and as they were in an open ward with access to the outside world, he could use them to go out and commit murders. Thus the fingerprints of senility patients were found at the crime scenes; their bodies carried out the murders, but the Gemini was in control of them.

The Gemini's motive originally was to shame his hated father, a preacher. When his father dies of natural causes, the Gemini feels his mission is over and he has no reason to remain in possession of Karras' body. Feeling compelled to explain everything to Kinderman, he summons the detective and succeeds in demanding that Kinderman tell him he believes he, Sunlight, really is the Gemini. He then wills himself to die from heart failure.

Dr. Temple suffers a stroke and ends up mentally disabled. Dr. Amfortas dies in a home accident after being repeatedly terrorized by a possible evil Doppelgänger of himself (although he was terminally ill in any case, from a disease he refused to treat so that he could join his deceased wife).

Kinderman later visits a burger bar with his faithful partner Atkins. Kinderman explains to Atkins his thoughts and musings on the case and how it relates to his problem of the concept of evil. Kinderman concludes that he believes the Big Bang was Lucifer falling from heaven, and that the entire universe, including humanity, are the broken parts of Lucifer, and that evolution is the process of Lucifer putting himself back together as an angel.

== New York Times Best Seller list court case ==
In 1983, Blatty sued the New York Times for $6 million, claiming that Legion had not been included in The New York Times Best Seller list either from negligence or intent, when sales figures justified its inclusion. The Times countered that the list was not mathematically objective but was editorial content and thus protected under the Constitution as free speech. Blatty appealed to the US Supreme Court, which declined to hear the case.

== Adaptations ==
Legion was adapted into a film, The Exorcist III, in 1990, directed by Blatty and starring George C. Scott as Lieutenant Kinderman and Brad Dourif and Jason Miller alternating as Sunlight (although the name Sunlight is not actually given to the character in the film; he is referred to as simply "the man in Cell 11" or "Patient X"). James Vennamun's surname is slightly altered to Venamun with a single n in the theatrical version.

Both the novel and film ignore the events of the 1977 film Exorcist II: The Heretic, a theatrical sequel with which Blatty had no involvement and which he panned.

On March 15, 2010, WildClaw Theatre in Chicago premiered the theatrical version. It was directed by Anne Adams and adapted by Charley Sherman.

An episodic video game adaptation exclusive to virtual reality, titled The Exorcist: Legion VR, was developed by Wolf & Wood, Ltd. and published by Fun Train for Steam VR, Meta (formerly Oculus) and PlayStation VR headsets in 2018. The game is loosely based on the premise and events of the Exorcist III film, while taking its name from the original novel. Though some shared plot elements appear, most episodes are standalone stories diverging from Blatty's narrative.
