= Oriol =

Oriol (Eastern Catalan: [uɾiˈɔl]) is a Catalan name, which can be found as a given name or a surname. It derives from the Latin word aureus (golden). It was originally just a surname, but started to be used as a given name in honour of Saint Joseph Oriol.

It may also be a Slavic surname literally meaning "eagle", a transliteration variant of Орёл, Oryol.

Notable people with the name include:

== Given name ==
- Oriol Almirón Ruiz
- Oriol Alsina
- Oriol Amat
- Oriol Ayala
- Oriol Busquets
- Oriol Bohigas
- Oriol Bohigas Martí
- Oriol de Bolòs
- Oriol Cardona Coll, Spanish ski mountaineer
- Oriol Combarros
- Oriol Combarros
- Oriol Elcacho, Catalan male model
- Oriol Jorge
- Oriol Junqueras, Catalan politician
- Oriol Junyent
- Oriol Lozano, Catalan footballer
- Oriol Martorell i Codina, Catalan music director, professor and politician
- Oriol Mitjà
- Oriol Mohedano
- Oriol Pamies
- Oriol Paulo
- Oriol Paulí
- Oriol Pla, Catalan actor
- Oriol Rangel
- Oriol Rey
- Oriol Riera, Catalan football player
- Oriol Ripol, Catalan rugby union player
- Oriol Roca Batalla
- Oriol Romeu, Catalan football player
- Oriol Rosell
- Oriol Salvia, Catalan squash player
- Oriol Sàbat
- Oriol Sellarès
- Oriol Servià, Catalan race car driver
- Oriol Soldevila
- Oriol Tarragó
- Oriol Valls
- Oriol Vinyals

== Surname ==
- André Oriol
- Antonio María Oriol Urquijo
- Clara Oriol de la Huerta
- Estevan Oriol, Mexican American photographer
- Fernand Oriol
- Gerald Oriol Jr.
- Saint Joseph Oriol, Spanish Catholic saint
- José Luis de Oriol y Urigüen, Spanish Carlist politician
- José María de Oriol y Urquijo, Spanish politician
- Mireia Oriol
- Joseph Oriol
- Paulette Poujol-Oriol
- Roger Oriol
- Rosa Oriol
- Veaceslav Oriol

== See also ==
- Auriol (disambiguation), French name also derived from "aureus"
