= Oriel =

Oriel may refer to:

== Places ==
=== Canada ===
- Oriel, a community in the municipality of Norwich, Ontario, Canada

=== Ireland ===
- Oriel Park, Dundalk, the home ground of Dundalk FC
- Oriel House, Ballincollig, County Cork
- Kingdom of Oriel (Airgíalla in Irish), a medieval kingdom in north-central Ireland
- Uriel (The Norman controlled part of Airgíalla, now represented by County Louth)

=== United Kingdom ===
- Oriel Street, Oxford
- Oriel Square, Oxford

== Education ==
- Oriel College, Oxford, part of the University of Oxford, England
- Oriel school (disambiguation)

== Art galleries ==
- Oriel Gallery, Dublin, Ireland
- Oriel Mostyn, Llandudno, Wales, now known as Mostyn
- Oriel y Parc, St Davids, Pembrokeshire, Wales, operated by Amgueddfa Cymru – Museum Wales
- Oriel Ynys Môn, Llangefni, Anglesey, Wales

== People ==
- Variant transliteration of the Hebrew given name Uriel, אוּרִיאֵל
- Oriel Álvarez Gómez (1923–2009), Chilean historian
- Oriel Domínguez (born 1953), Cuban water polo player
- Oriel Filho
- Oriel Gray (1920–2003), Australian dramatist and playwright
- Oriel Kennerson
- Oriel Malet (1923–2014), pen name of British author Lady Auriel Rosemary Malet Vaughan
- Oriel Monongoaha, South African activist
- Oriel Lea Plaza (died 1943), Bolivian aviation captain who died in the Chaco War
- Oriel Ross (1907–1994), English actress and model

== Other uses ==
- Oriel (scripting language), for Microsoft Windows
- Oriel Wind Farm, proposed offshore wind farm planned for the Irish sea
- Oriel window, a type of bay window which projects from a wall
- The Oriel, a former restaurant in Gilford, County Down, Northern Ireland
- Baron Oriel, a title in the Peerage of Ireland
- Oriel, an alternative name for the archangel Uriel

== See also ==
- Oriel Chambers, Liverpool, England
- Oriel Chambers, Kingston upon Hull, England
- Oriel House, Ballincollig, County Cork, Ireland, a hotel
- Oriel House, Westland Row, Dublin, Ireland
- Oriella
- Auriol (disambiguation)
- Oriol
