= Uriel (disambiguation) =

Uriel Hebrew: אוּרִיאֵל is the name of an archangel in the Judeo-Christian tradition. It may also refer to:

== People ==
- Uriel Adriano (born 1990), Mexican taekwondo practitioner
- Uriel Álvarez (born 1990), Mexican footballer
- Uriel Antuna (born 1997), Mexican footballer
- Uriel Birnbaum (1894–1956), Austrian painter and writer
- Uriel Buso (born 1973), Israeli politician
- Uriel Crocker (1796–1887), publisher in Boston, USA
- Uriel da Costa (c.1585–1640), Portuguese philosopher
- Uriel da Veiga (born 1940), Brazilian footballer
- Uriel Davidi (1922–2006), Iranian rabbi
- Uriel Davis (born 1943), Israeli academic
- Uriel del Toro (born 1978), Mexican actor and model
- Uriel Emil (born 1975), Israeli actor
- Uriel Feige (born 19??), Israeli computer scientist
- Uriel Fernandes (1913–2000), Brazilian footballer
- Uriel Flores Aguayo (born 1959), Mexican politician
- Uriel Frisch (born 1940), French physicist
- Andrés Uriel Gallego (1950–2014), Colombian civil engineer and politician
- Uriel Górka (1435–1498), Bishop of Poznań
- Uriel Holmes (1764–1827), American politician
- Uriel Jones (1934–2009), American musician
- Uriel Jové (born 1999), Argentine footballer
- Uriel López Paredes (born 1959), Mexican politician
- Uriel Lubrani (1926–2018), Israeli diplomat, military official, and national security advisor
- Uriel Lynn (born 1935), Israeli politician
- Uriel Macias (born 1994), American footballer
- Uriel Miron (born 1968), Israeli artist
- Uriel Molina (born 1932), Nicaraguan theologian
- Uriel Nespoli (1884–1973), Italian conductor
- Uriel Ofek (1926–1987), Israeli writer
- Uriel Pérez (born 1976), Uruguayan footballer.
- Uriel Ramírez Kloster (born 1999), Argentine footballer
- Uriel Rappaport (1935–2019), Israeli historian
- Uriel Reichman (born 1942), Israeli legal scholar, former politician, and president of the Interdisciplinary Center Herzliya
- Uriel Rothblum (1947–2012), Israeli mathematician
- Uriel Sebree (1848–1922), American Naval officer
- Uriel Sebree Hall (1852–1932), American politician
- Uriel Trocki (born 1996), Uruguayan-Israeli basketball player for Hapoel Holon of the Israeli Basketball Premier League
- Uriel Shelach (1908–1981), Israeli poet
- Uriele Vitolo (1831–?), Italian sculptor
- Uriel von Gemmingen (1468–1514), Archbishop of Mainz
- Uriel Waizel (born 1973), Mexican radio personality
- Uriel Weinreich (1926–67), Polish-American linguist
- Uriel Yekutiel (born 1988), Israeli performer, dancer and actor
- Uriel Yitzhaki (born 1949), Israeli diplomat
- Uriel, name adopted by Unarius leader Ruth Norman

== Fictional characters ==
- Uriel (Supernatural), in the television series Supernatural
- Uriel Septim, various characters in The Elder Scrolls video games
- Uriel (Omniscient Reader's Viewpoint), in the web-novel/webtoon series Omniscient Reader's Viewpoint

== Literature ==
- "Uriel" (poem), by Ralph Waldo Emerson
- Uriel, a planet in the book A Wrinkle in Time

== Music ==
- Uriel (band), 1960s acid rock band

== Places ==
- County Louth, in medieval times also called Uriel
- Airgíalla, anglicised spelling Uriel, medieval Irish kingdom
  - Uriel, collective name for the confederation of tribes in Airgíalla

== See also ==
- Oriel (disambiguation)
- Saint Urielle
- Urial, subspecies group of the wild sheep Ovis orientalis
- Uria, seabirds called guillemots, murres, or turr
- Uriah (disambiguation)
