= Catherine Tobin =

Author and translator

Catherine Ellis Tobin
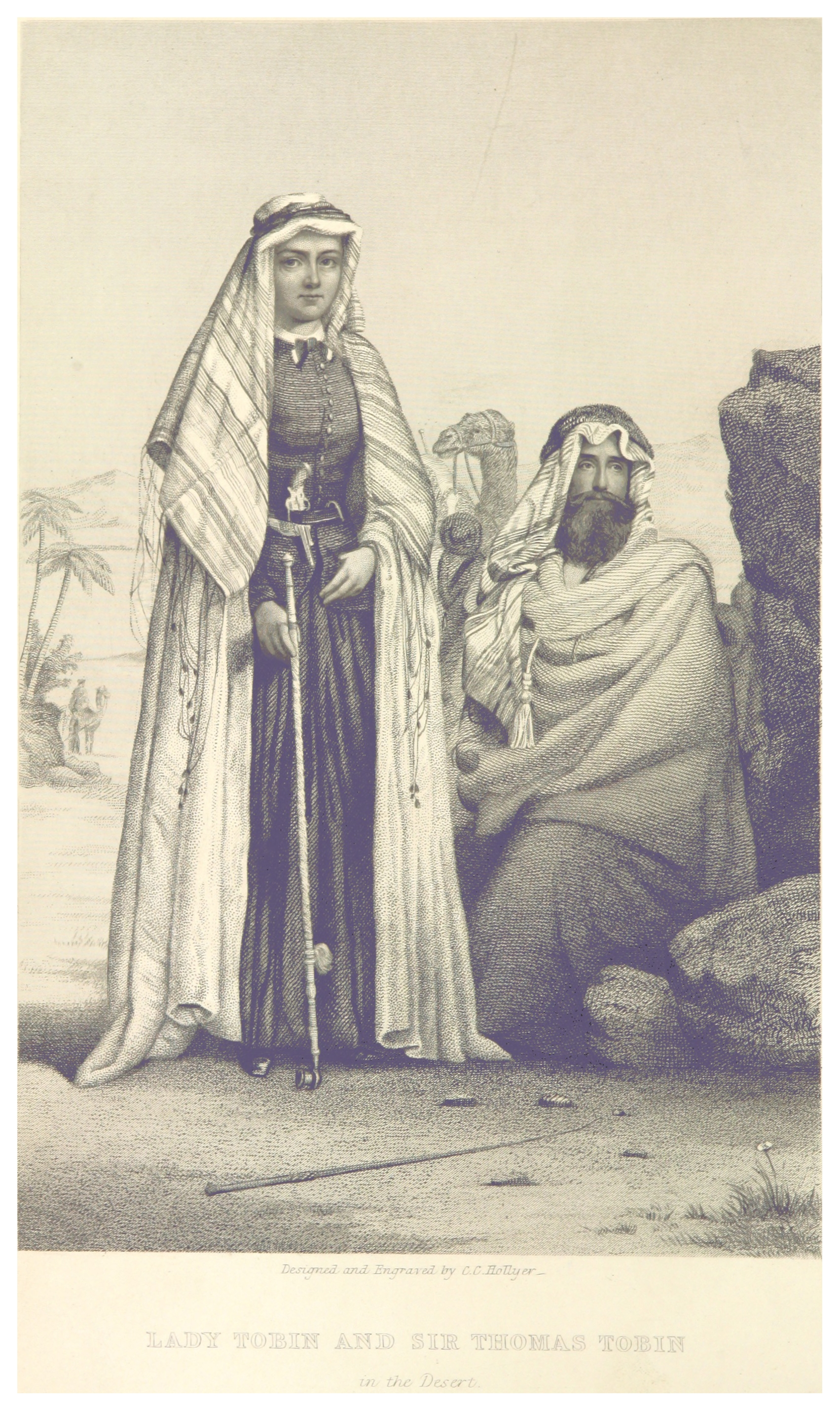
- Lady Tobin and Sir Thomas Tobin
- Born: Catherine Ellis
- Died: 1903
- Occupation: Writer

Catherine Tobin (died 1903) was a Victorian era author and artist who travelled with her husband and wrote books around the experiences as well as a translator for a book on the area.

== Life ==
Born Catherine Ellis, daughter of Lister Ellis of Crofthead, Cumberland she married Thomas Tobin on 12 September 1835. She had one son, Arthur Lionel Tobin who was born when they lived in Ballincollig, County Cork. He died as a young man, injured in battle. Though the family lived in a few houses in Cork their main residence was Oriel House. However Tobin and her husband shared an interest in travel and antiquities and spent considerable time in the middle and near east. She wrote a number of books due to this interest and travel as well as translating another. At home in Cork, Tobin was a patron of the South Infirmary Victoria University Hospital for many years.

George Kelleher has suggested that while Thomas Tobin was an "antiquarian and curio collector in the spirit of the Victorian age", his wife Catherine, "was a far more considerable cultural figure". Her work has served as the basis for a number of studies about the regions.

Originally from the UK, when her husband died, Tobin moved first to Albert House Mansion in London and then to Eastham House in Cheshire, where her brother in law James Aspinall Tobin lived. She died there on 23 April 1903.

== Bibliography ==
- Shadows of the East, Or, Slight Sketches of Scenery, Persons, and Customs: From Observations During a Tour in 1853 and 1854, in Egypt, Palestine, Syria, Turkey and Greece. Longman, Brown, Green, and Longmans. 1855.
- The Land of Inheritance. Quaritch, London. 1863.
- Illustration of Discoveries at Nineveh. Longman, Brown, Green, and Longmans. 1850. by Paul-Émile Botta (Trans.)

== Gallery ==
Pictures from Tobin's 1855 book:

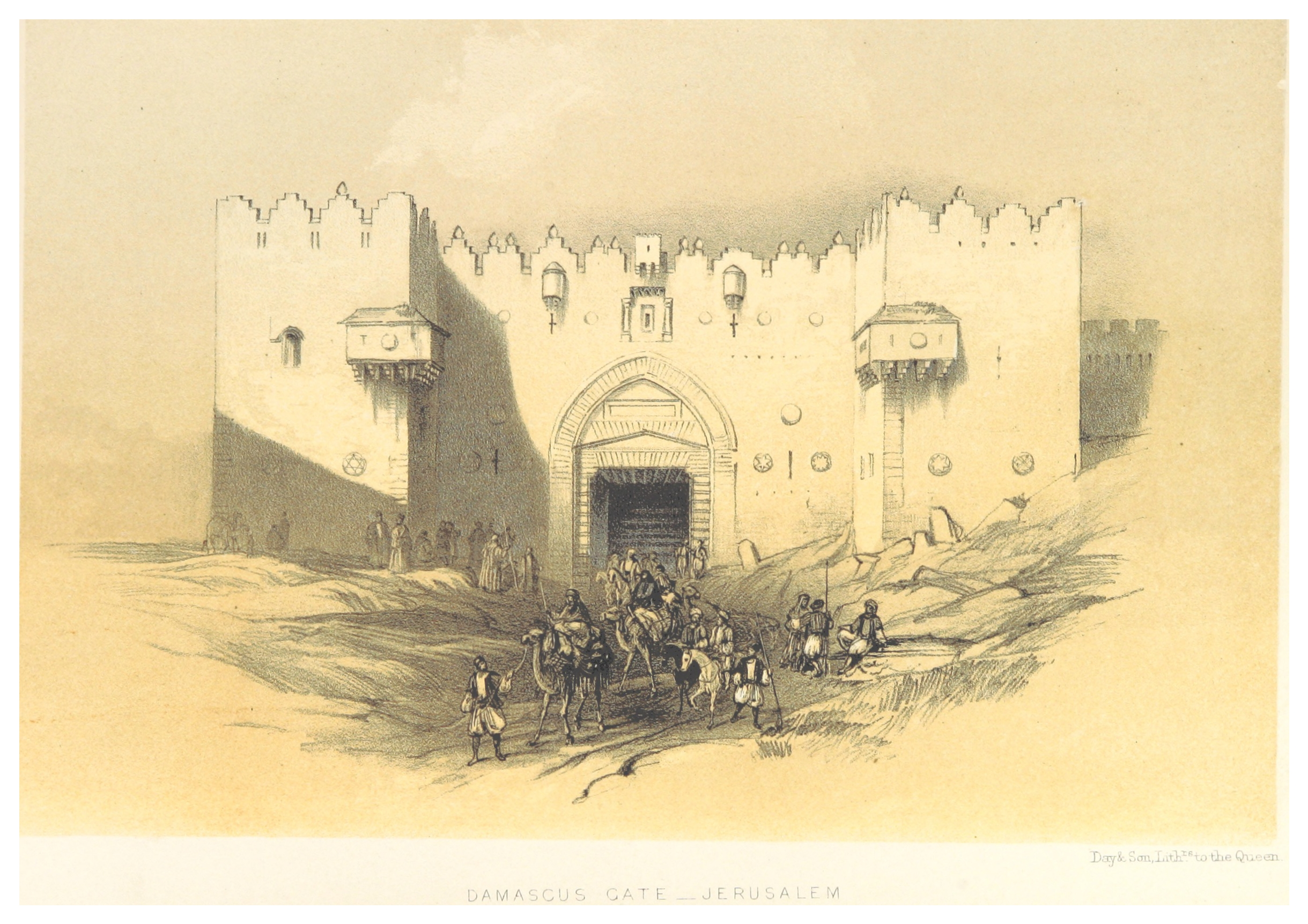
Damascus Gate

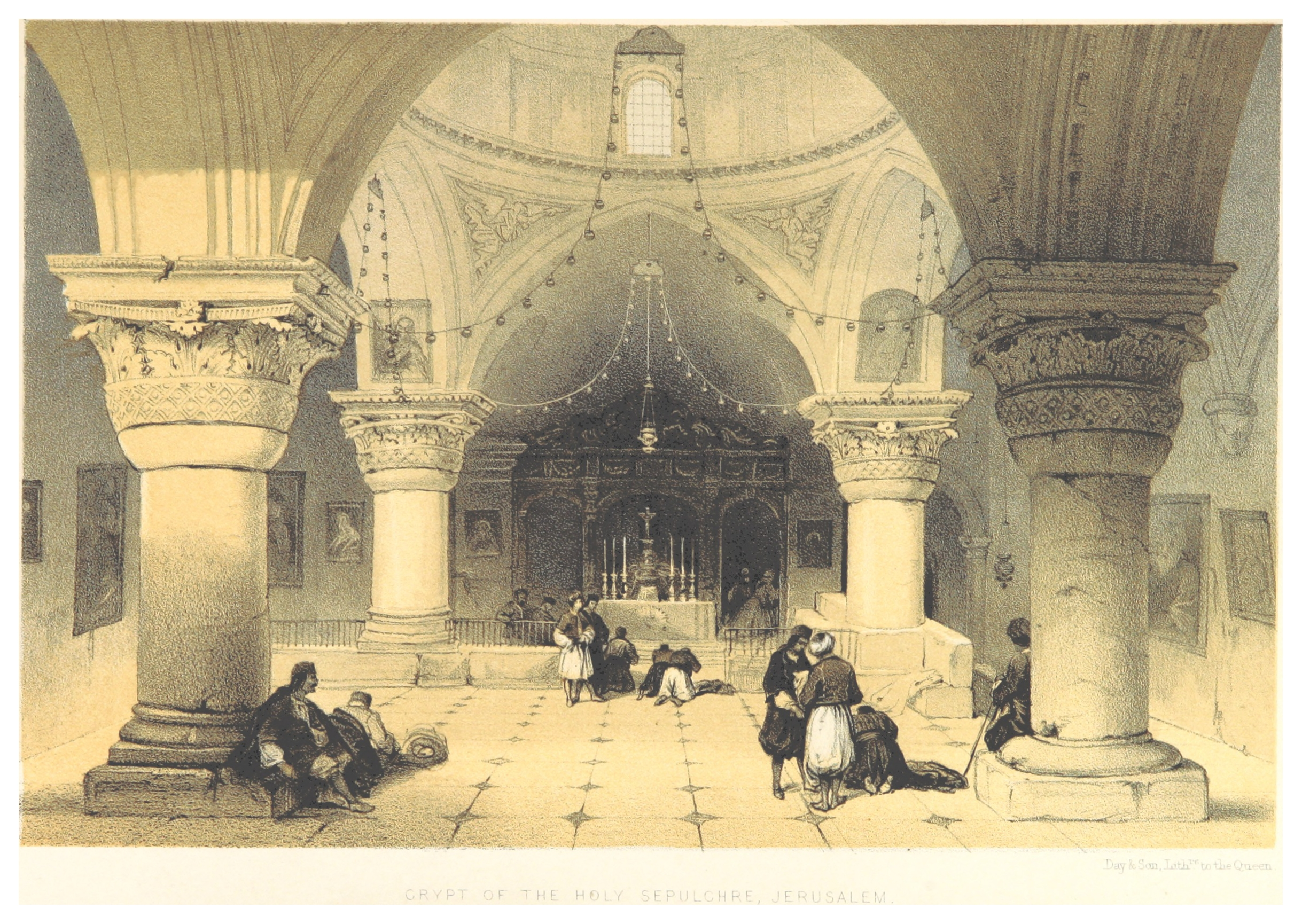
Chapel of Saint Helena, Jerusalem

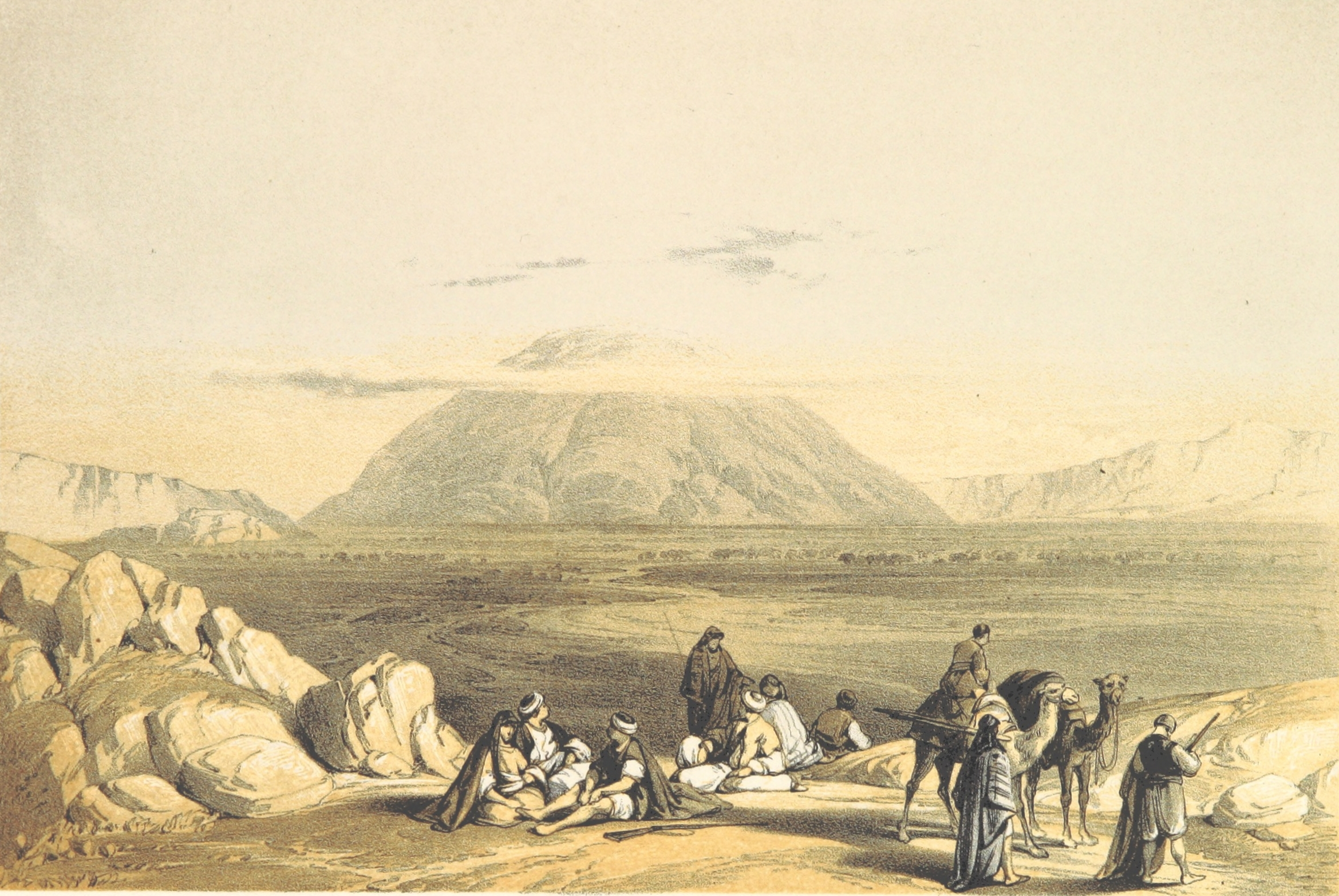
Mount Tabor

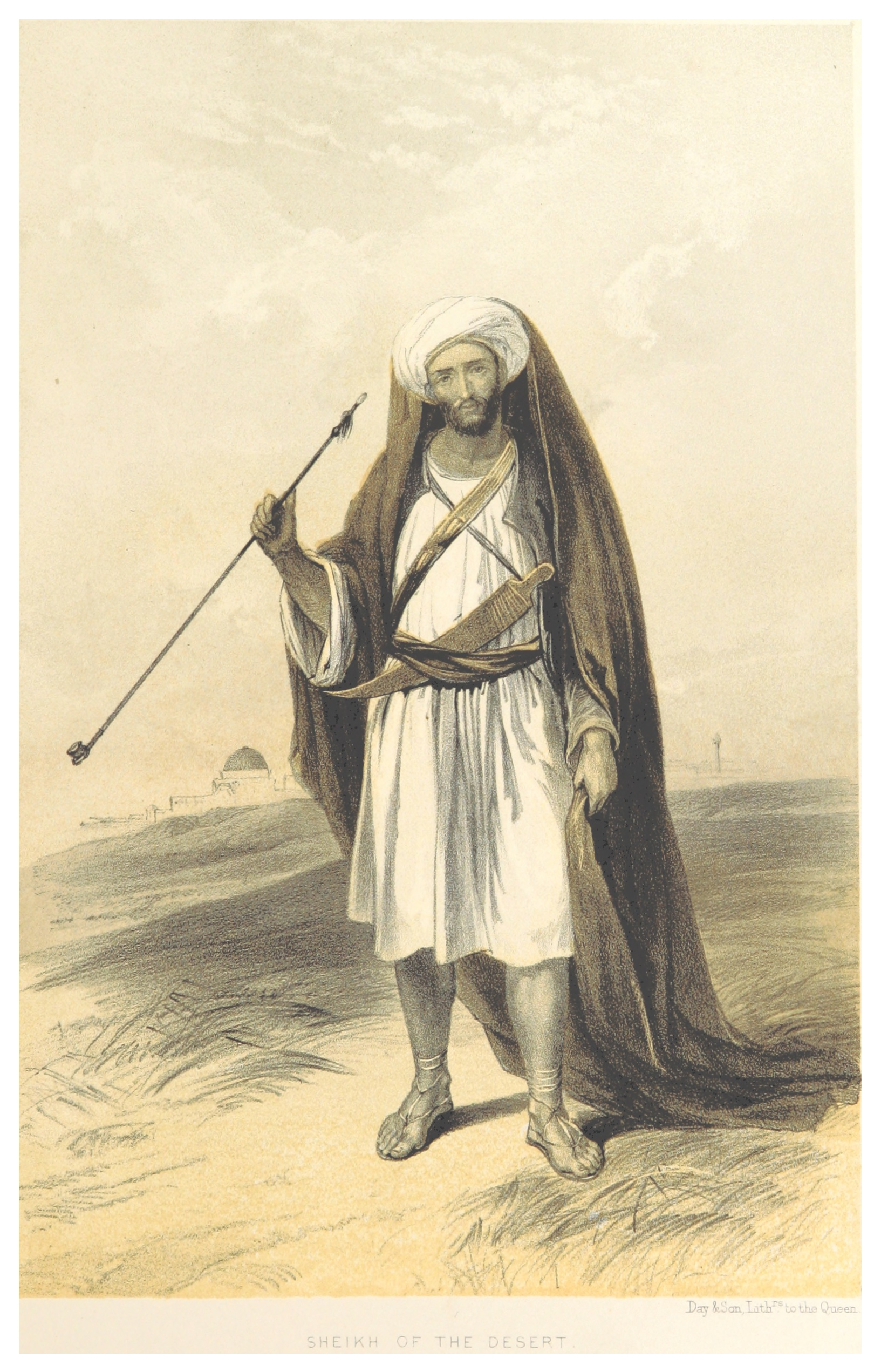
Sheikh of the desert

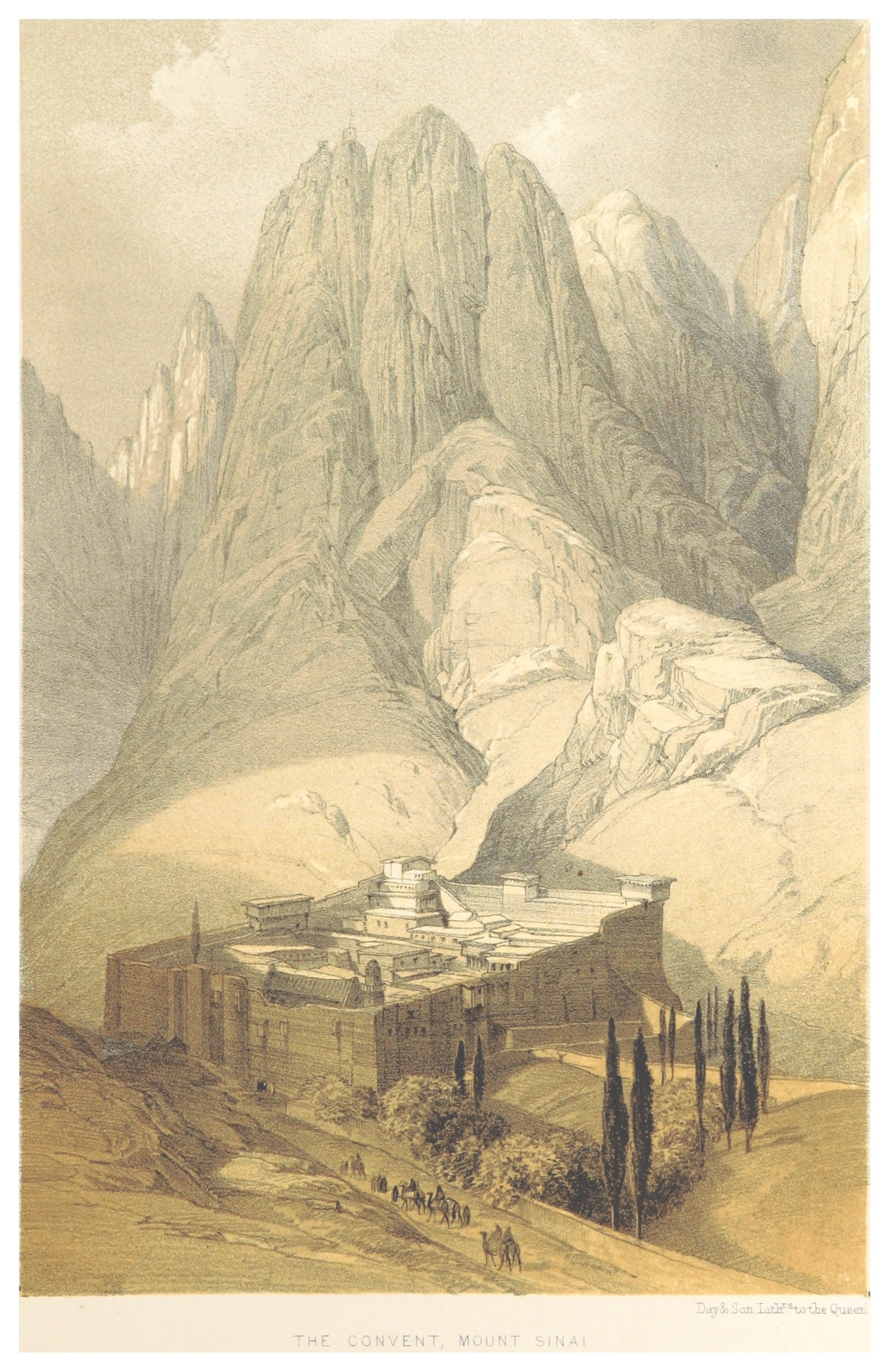
Saint Catherine's Monastery

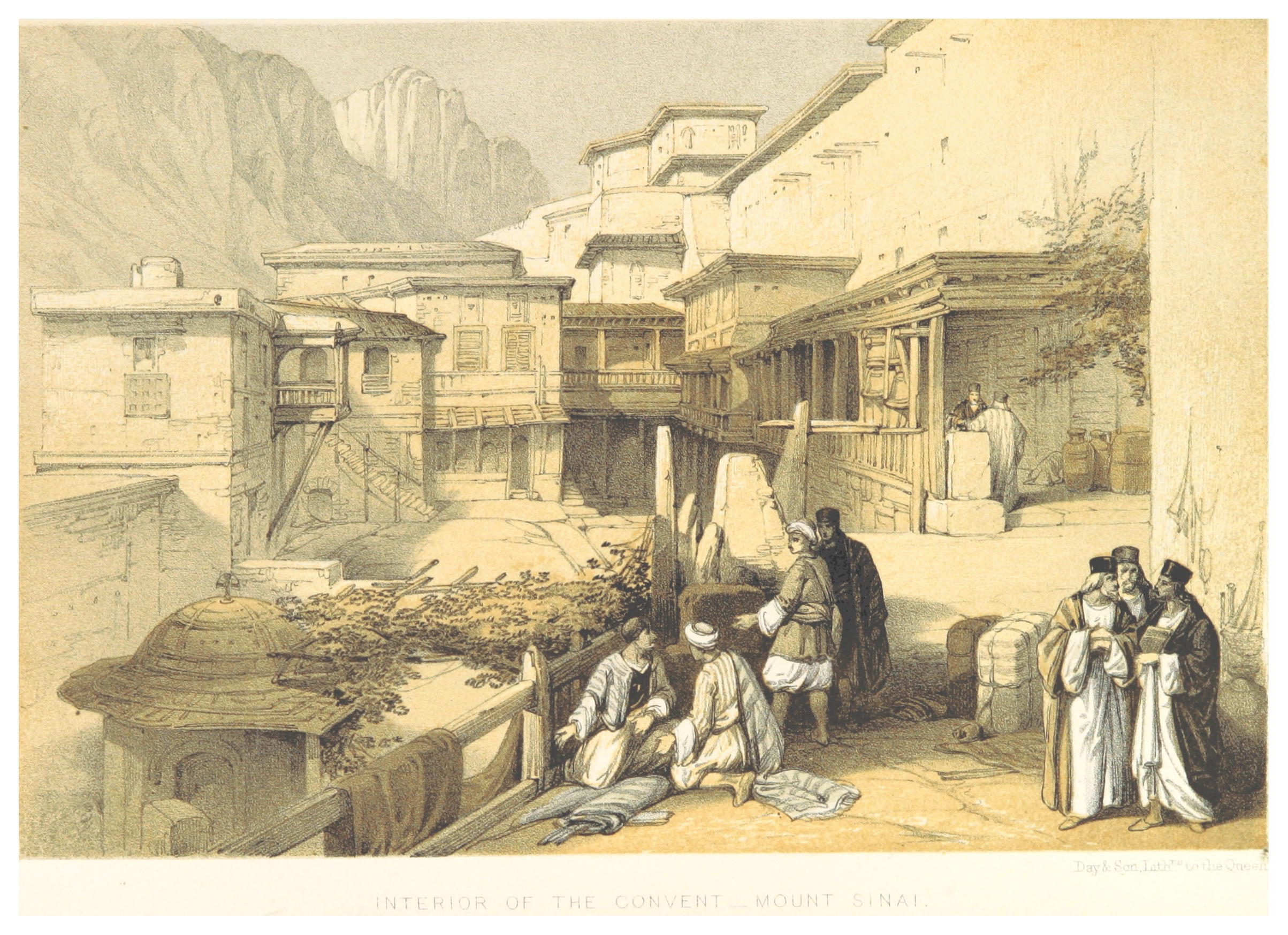
Saint Catherine's Monastery

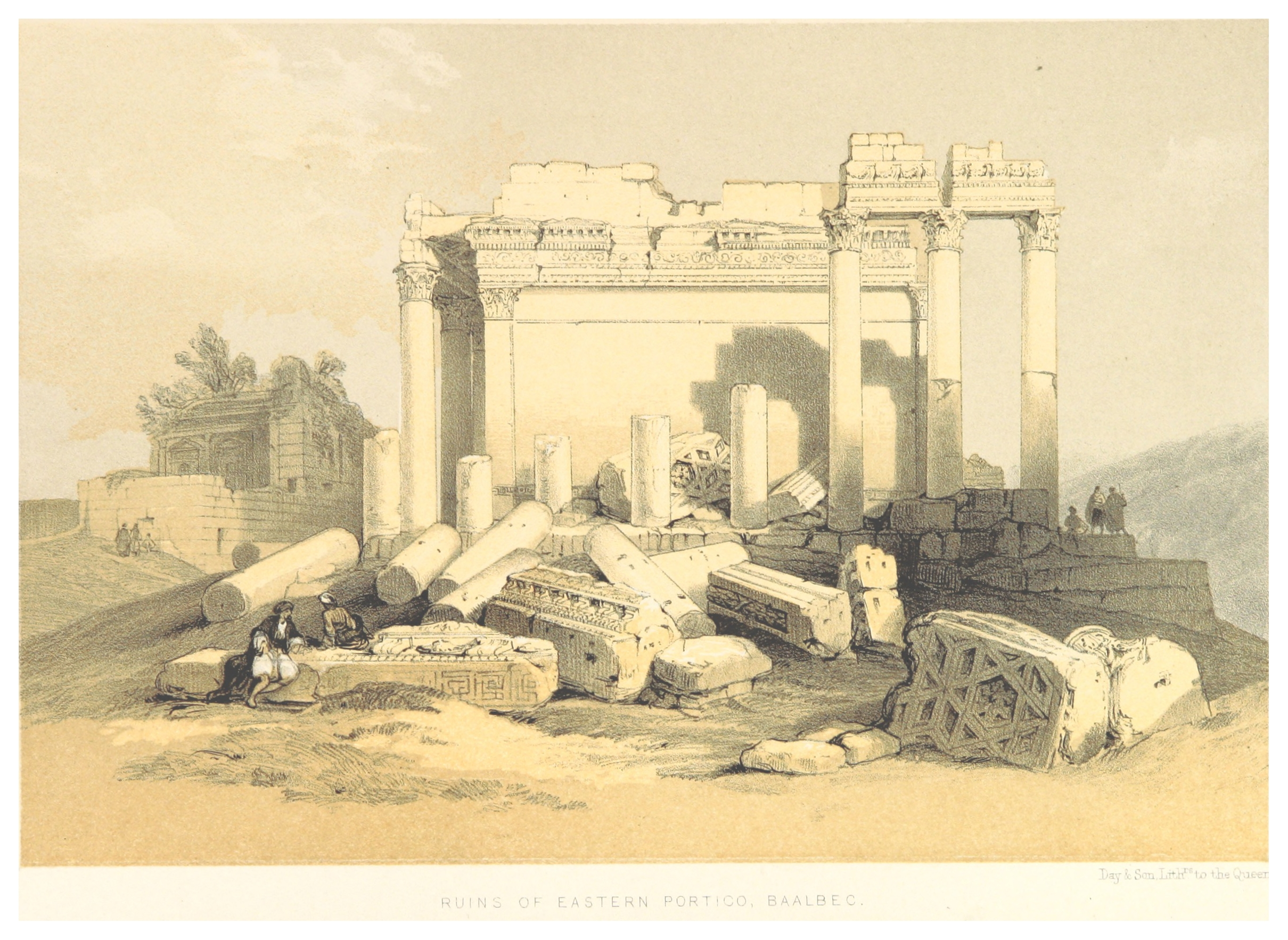
Baalbek

David Roberts views in 1839, published in The Holy Land, Syria, Idumea, Arabia, Egypt, and Nubia:

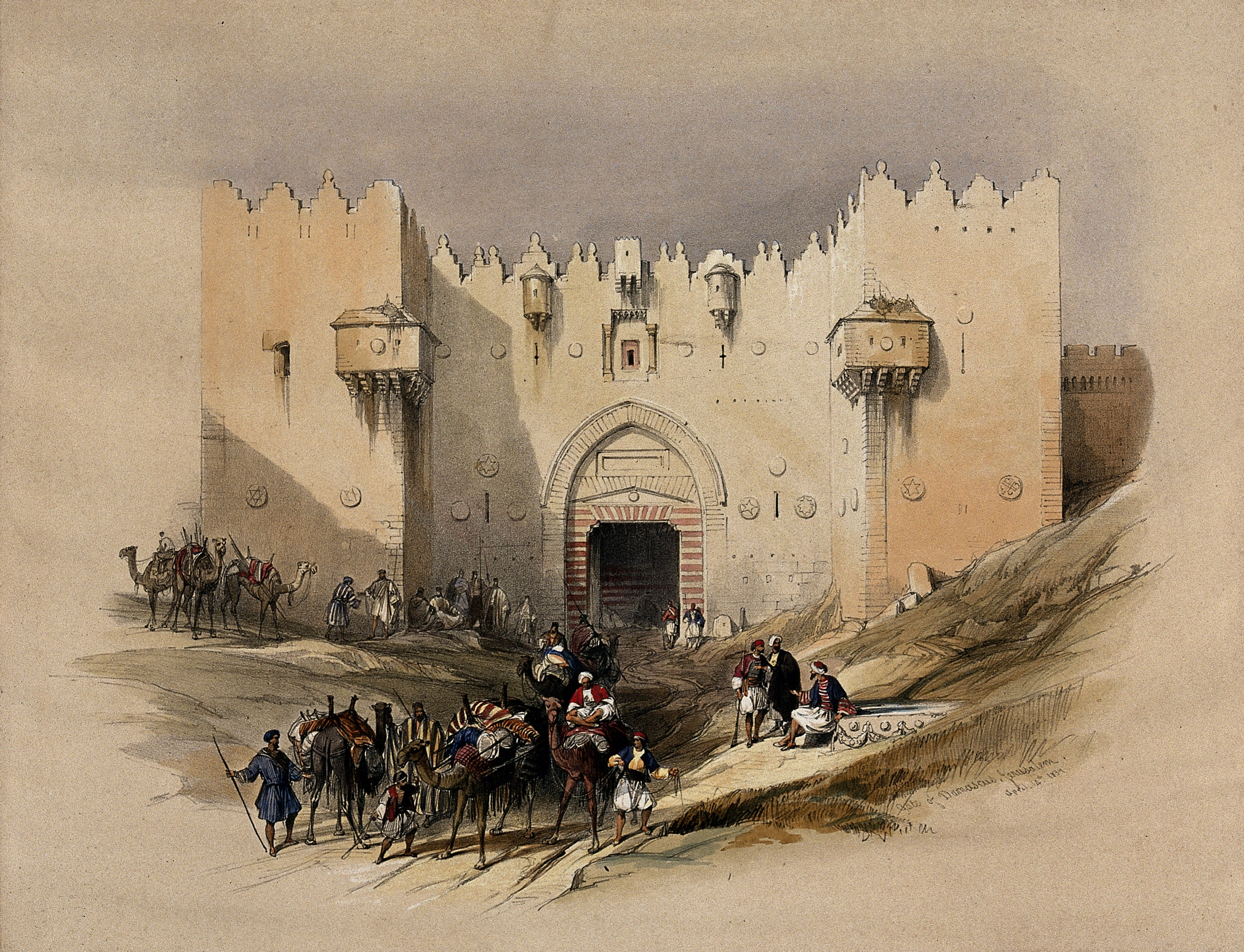
Damascus Gate

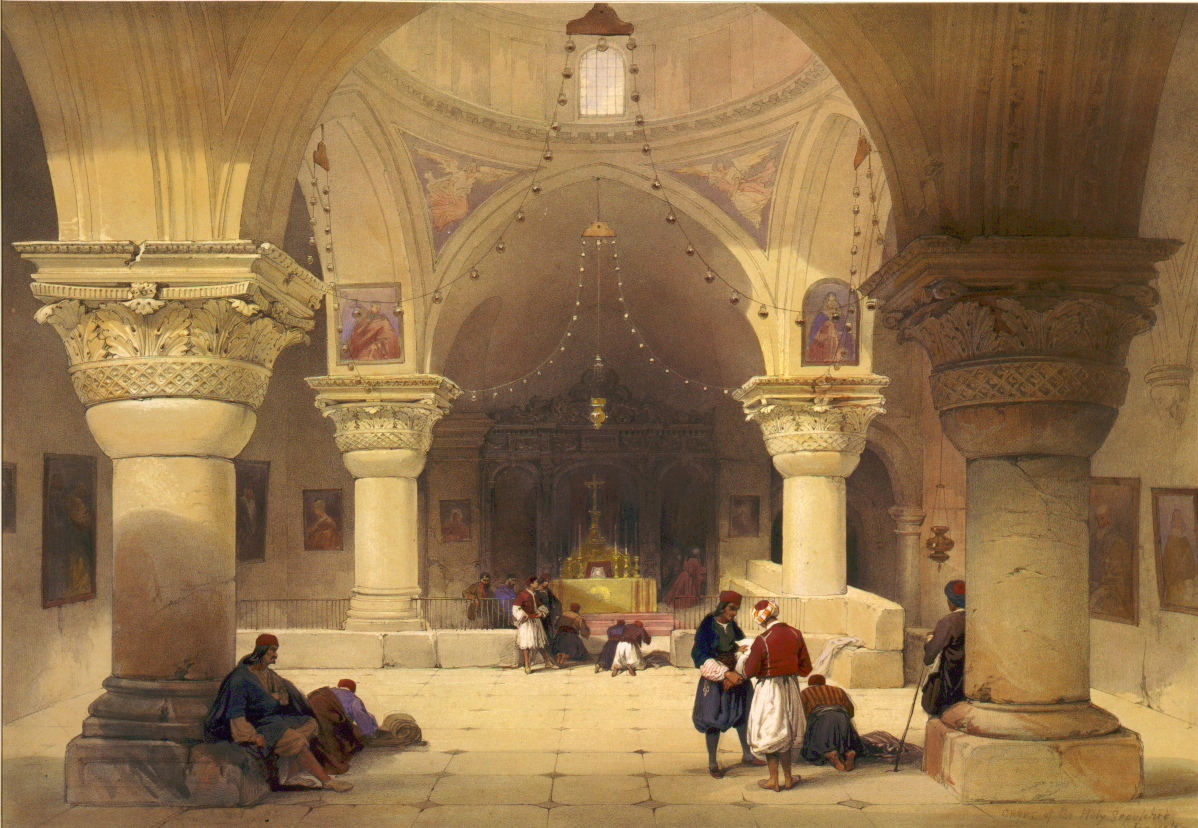
Chapel of Saint Helena, Jerusalem

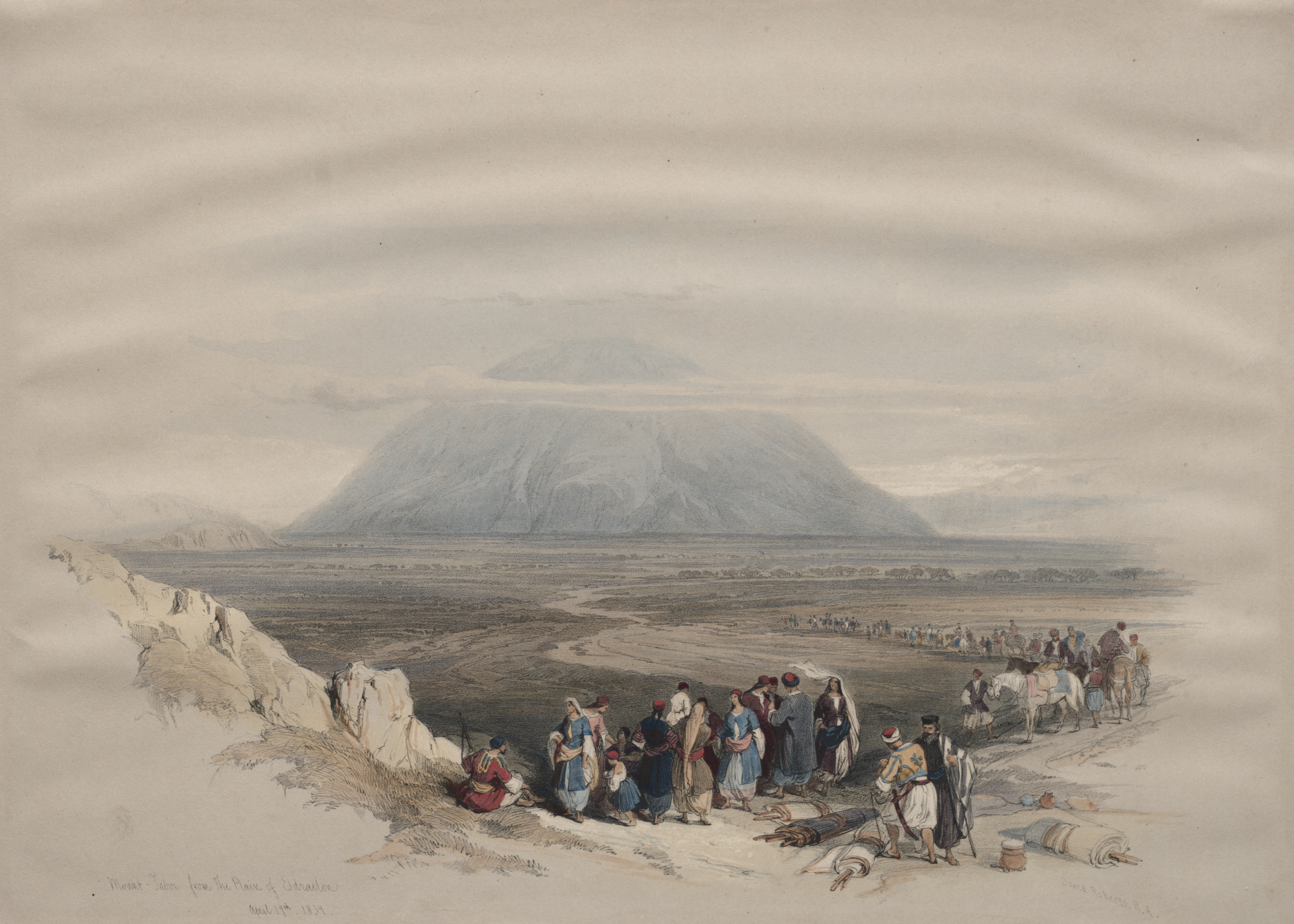
Mount Tabor

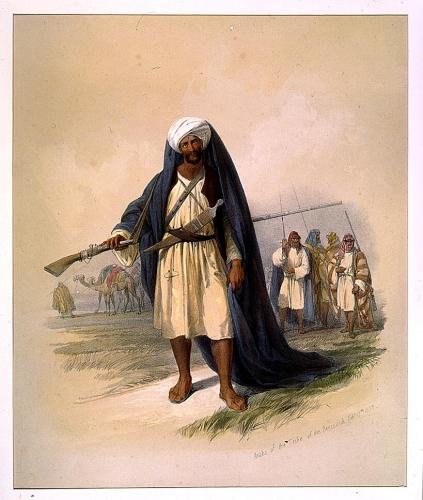
Sheikh of the desert

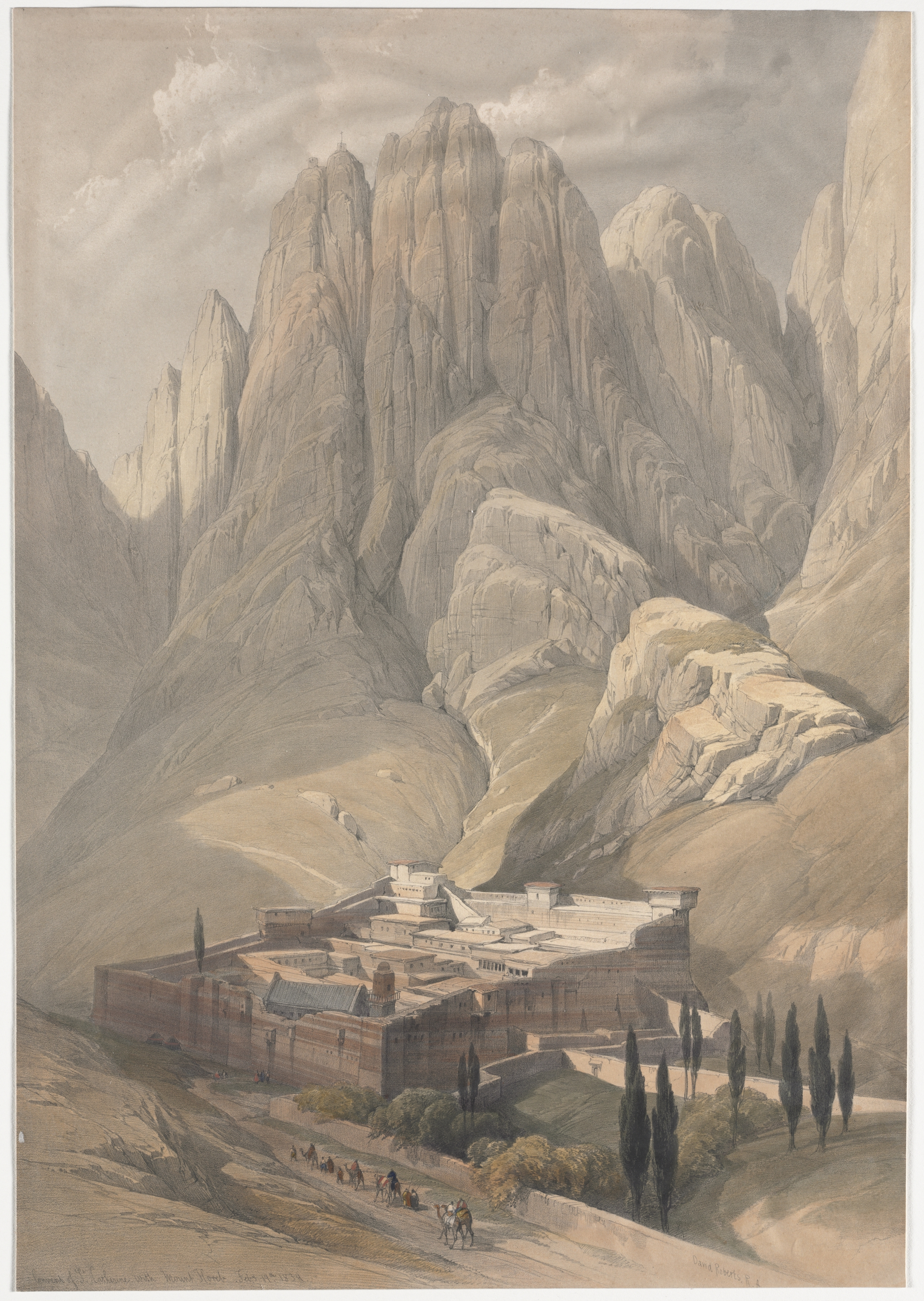
Saint Catherine's Monastery

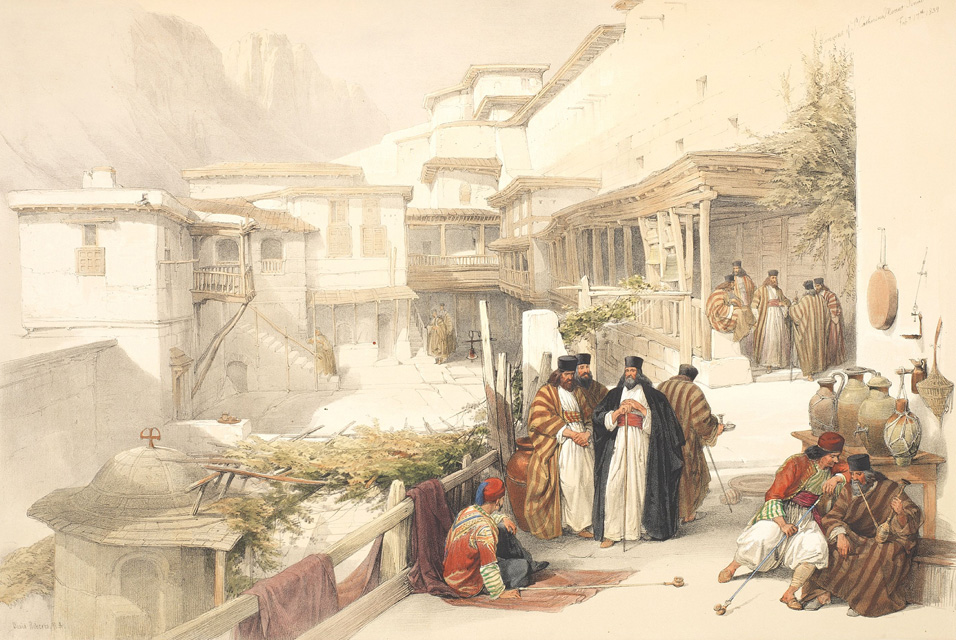
Saint Catherine's Monastery

Baalbek
