= Schreiner Baduza =

South African activist

Schreiner Baduza (born 1909) was a South African activist who organized squatting actions in the Alexandra township in the City of Johannesburg Metropolitan Municipality. He was forcibly relocated away from Alexandra and when he returned became a church minister.

== Early life ==
Schreiner was born in the village of Bikana in the Transkei bantustan on 18 July 1909. After working as a miner, he married and moved to Alexandra township in the City of Johannesburg Metropolitan Municipality. He set up a business making theft protection for windows.

== Activism ==
In 1935, Baduza set up the Bantu Tenants Association in Alexandra. He knew Nelson Mandela, who later described him in a letter from prison as one of his best friends from that time. Baduza became a squatter leader like Oriel Monongoaha in Orlando West and Abel Ntoi in Pimville. He was reluctant to become a leader and it ruined his business, but it followed on from his activism supporting bus boycotts and tenant movements.

In 1946, Baduza made several attempts to organise informal settlements on vacant land. He was arrested on the first land invasion and for the third organized over 600 families to squat in Orlando. The squatters were then relocated back to Alexandra and he later set up a tent village in Alexandra to protest the national housing crisis. Baduza was then himself forcibly relocated to the Hammanskraal and from there moved back to the Transkei, before returning to Soweto. He was not permitted to work as a housing activist and so he became a church minister.

== See also ==
- Modikwe Dikobe
- James Mpanza
