= Oriel school =

Oriel school may refer to:

- Oriel High School, Crawley, England
- Ormiston Venture Academy, Great Yarmouth, England, formerly called Oriel Grammar School, Oriel High School and Oriel Specialist Maths and Computing College

== See also ==
- Oriel (disambiguation)
