= Phanuel (angel) =

Fourth angel who stands before God in the Book of Enoch

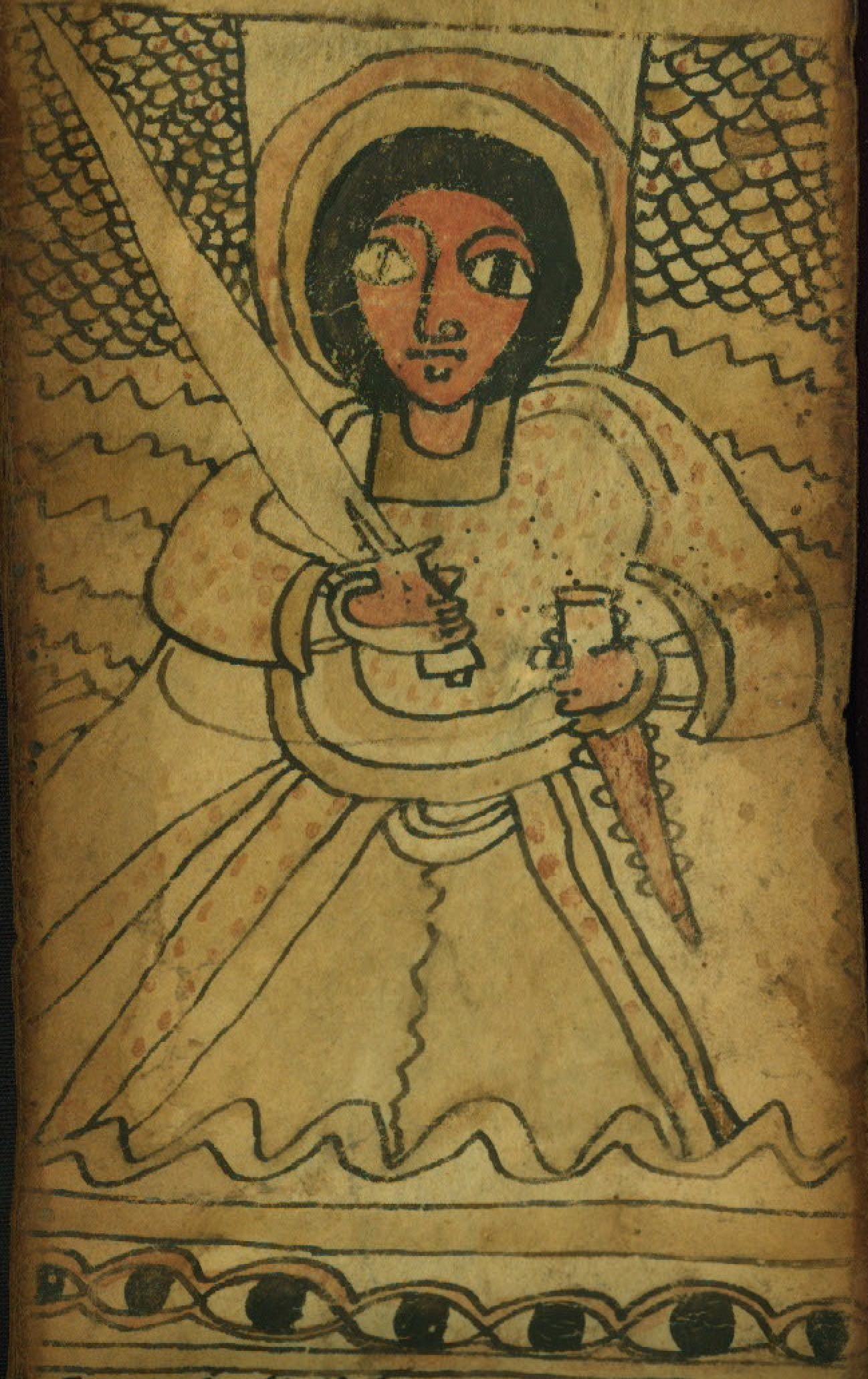
- Archangel Phanuel depicted in the Ethiopian scroll with the Lion of Judah. It contains prayers against evil which invoke the help of this archangel.

Archangel
- Venerated in: Judaism; Ethiopian Orthodox Tewahedo Church

Phanuel is the name given to the fourth angel who stands before God in the Book of Enoch (ca. 300 BC), after the angels Michael, Raphael, and Gabriel.

Other spellings of Phanuel (Hebrew: פְּנוּאֵל or פְּנִיאֵל Pənūʾēl/Pənīʾēl, Tiberian: Pănūʾēl/Pănīʾēl) include Panuel, Paniel, Peniel, Penuel, Fanuel, and Feniel. As Panuel, his name means "God has turned", but as Paniel, his name means "The face of God".

== Narrative ==
Phanuel was one of the four voices Enoch heard praising God.

This first is Michael, the merciful and long-suffering: and the second, who is set over all the diseases and all the wounds of the children of men, is Raphael: and the third, who is set over all the powers, is Gabriel: and the fourth, who is set over the repentance unto hope of those who inherit eternal life, is named Phanuel. (1 Enoch 40:9)

== Interpretations ==
As an angel, Phanuel is reputedly a member of the four Angels of Presence. In 1st Enoch, he is also listed as an angel of exorcism (he is heard "expelling Satans"). Phanuel has also been linked with the Angel of Penance mentioned in the Shepherd of Hermas.

Some associate Phanuel with Uriel; although some others see this as debatable. Phanuel's duties include bearing up God's throne, ministering Truth, and serving as an angel of judgement. According to The Book of Enoch, Phanuel is the fourth angel "set over repentance and those who hope to inherit eternal life" [Enoch, Chapter 40:9]. He is the fourth voice heard [Enoch, Chapter 40:7] "fending off the Satans (adversaries or accusers) and forbidding them to come before the Lord of spirits to accuse them who dwell on the earth".

== See also ==
- Seven Archangels
- List of angels in theology

== Bibliography ==
- Bunson, Matthew (ed.) (1996). Phanuel Angels A to Z New York. Three Rivers Press.
- Lumpkin, Joseph B (ed.) (2004). The Lost Book of Enoch: A Comprehensive Transliteration of the Forgotten Book of the Bible. Fifth Estate Publishers
