= Oryol (surname) =

Oryol (Russian: Орёл) is a Russian surname literally meaning "eagle". The Ukrainian equivalent is Orel (Ukrainian: Орел) . Notable people with the surname include:

- Aleksandr Oryol (1909–1997), Soviet naval officer
- Grigory Oryol, Soviet armored corps general
- Vladimir Oryol (1952–2007), Russian linguist
- Vyacheslav Oryol or Veaceslav Oriol, Moldovan cyclist
