= Thomas Tobin =

British merchant

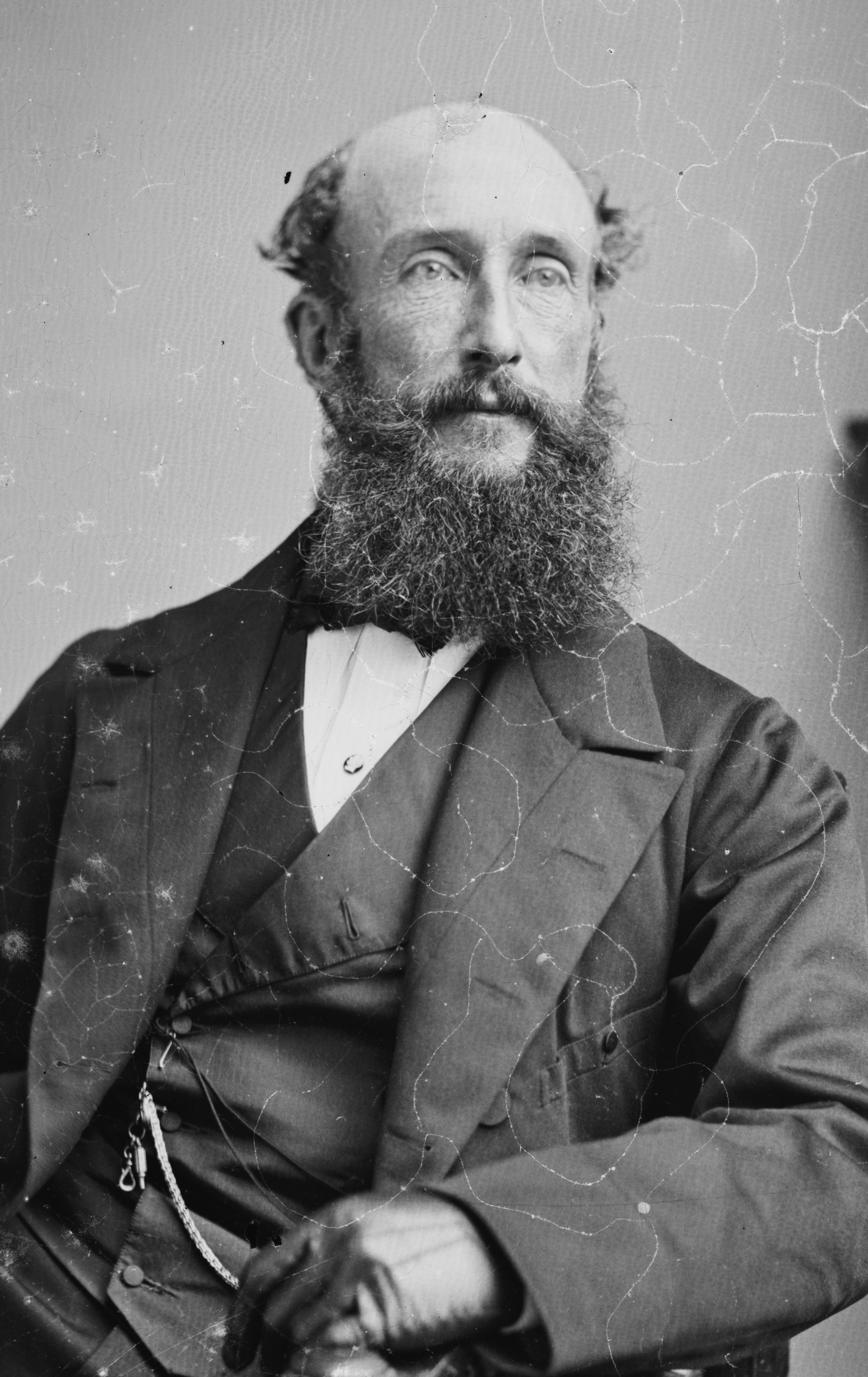
Sir Thomas Tobin

Sir Thomas Tobin (22 March 1807 – 9 January 1881) was a British merchant. He moved to Ballincollig in 1863 to become managing director of Ballincollig Royal Gunpowder Mills. He played an active part in the social and industrial life of Ballincollig and Cork until his death in 1881.

== Tobins of Liverpool ==
The Tobins were an important merchant family in Liverpool at a time when the city was rapidly expanding at the end of the 18th and beginning of the 19th centuries. Thomas's grandfather, Patrick, was a native of Ireland and lived on the Isle of Man. Two of Patrick's sons, John and Thomas, became apprentice seamen and later master mariners. They both built their prosperity on the slave trade later branching into palm oil and ivory. They had estates in Africa which employed many black people.

After the emancipation many of these slaves came to England, and it was not uncommon to see coloured people in Liverpool who bore a mark identifying them as having once been on the servitude of the Tobins. John became Mayor of Liverpool in 1819 and was knighted on the ascension of George IV to the throne. On 19 July 1821, George IV's Coronation Day, Prince's Dock was opened, and the Tobins ship, May, was the first ship which entered and in honour of the occasion she was exempted from paying Town or Dock Dues.

== Thomas' father and family ==
On 6 June 1806, John's brother, Thomas, married Esther Watson, daughter of Richard Watson of Preston in Preston Church. They took up residence in Bold Street in Liverpool. At that time Bold Street had not become a shopping street but consisted of dwelling houses of well-to-do merchants, many of whom had their counting houses at the back. About halfway up the street Thomas Tobin, senior, lived in a fine house with a counting house behind. Thomas Tobin, senior, had a large family-six boys and six girls. The eldest of these were also called Thomas after his father and he was born on 22 March 1807, and was baptised in St. Peter's Church, Church Street, on 26 June 1807. Very little is known about the young Thomas' upbringing, except, as the oldest son, he naturally became involved in his father's business.

== Powder mills ==
In 1833–34, Tobin and company of Liverpool purchased the dilapidated powder mills in Ballincollig from the British Board of Ordnance. Thomas junior was involved in inspecting the buildings before the purchase was concluded for £15,00.

With the renovation and the opening of the mills, Thomas junior was sent to Ballincollig by his father to become managing director of the mills. It seems unusual that Thomas, as the oldest son, was not kept in Liverpool to inherit the family in the business. But in the mid-1830s Thomas was the only son available to go to Ballincollig. One son had died at six months, a second was in the Army, a third was not yet twenty, while the fourth, James Aspinall, who later took over to Liverpool business, was only seventeen.

It is clear Thomas took an active interest in the running of the mills, which grew rapidly. He is credited with making Ballincollig "almost a model village". In March 1806, on his retirement from his position as managing director, he was presented with "'a magnificent piece of plate' by the supervisors and workmen, a small token of their deep regret…. And of their gratitude for the kindness and humanity with which he always exercised his authority".

== Family ==
Shortly after taking up his position as managing director in 1835, Thomas married Catherine Ellis, daughter of Lister Ellis of Crofthead, Cumberland, on 12 September 1835. They had one child, a son, Arthur Lionel, who was born in Ballincollig on 7 August 1837. Arthur became a lieutenant in the 23rd Royal Welch Fusiliers with whom he served in the Crimean War and in the Indian Mutiny. He was wounded in the thigh while fighting at the capture of Kaiserbogh, Lucknow (16 March 1858) and died on 12 October 1858. He was buried near Lucknow. Saddened by the death of their only son and child at 21 years of age, Tobin presented a stained glass window to St. Peter's Church, Carrigrohane, to commemorate his son, and also presented a memorial to the Royal Welch Fusiliers.

Tobin endowed a boat in his son's name with the Royal National Lifeboat Institution (RNLI), of which Tobin himself was the local representative. The Arthur Lionel (ON 626), was a 35-foot Liverpool-class lifeboat, stationed at St Peter Port (1912–1929) and at Minehead (1930–1939).

== Oriel House ==
Thomas and Catherine lived in Oriel House, Ballincollig, from 1835. But in the early 1850s he rented the castle in Ballincollig and intended to have it 'repaired and protected from further decay'. He also intended to have the grounds around it "tastefully planted". Instead, in the mid-1850s he seemed to live for a while in Bridepark, Ovens. However, after that he lived in the Oriel House until his death in 1881.

== Travel and antiquities ==
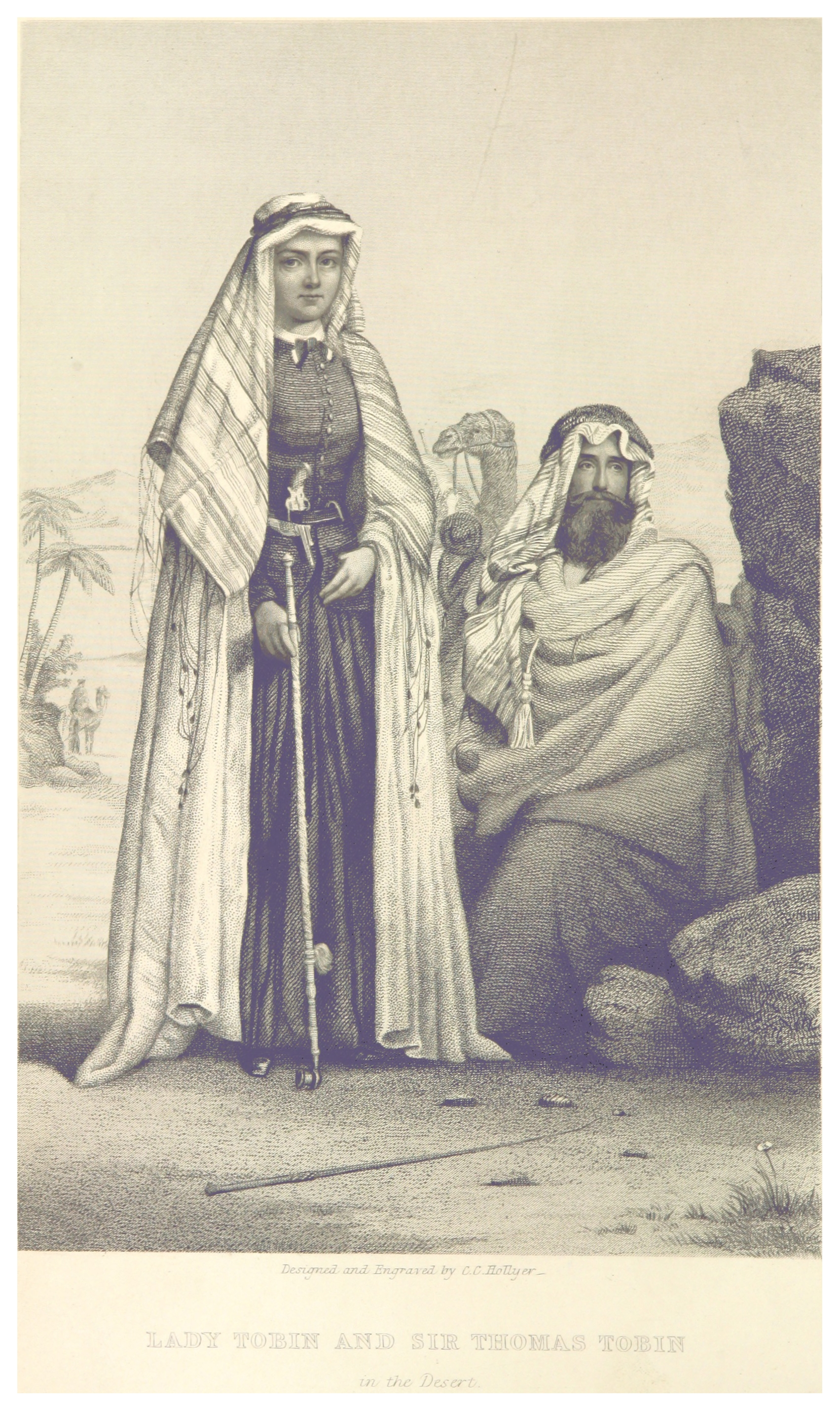
Catherine and Thomas Tobin in Egypt.

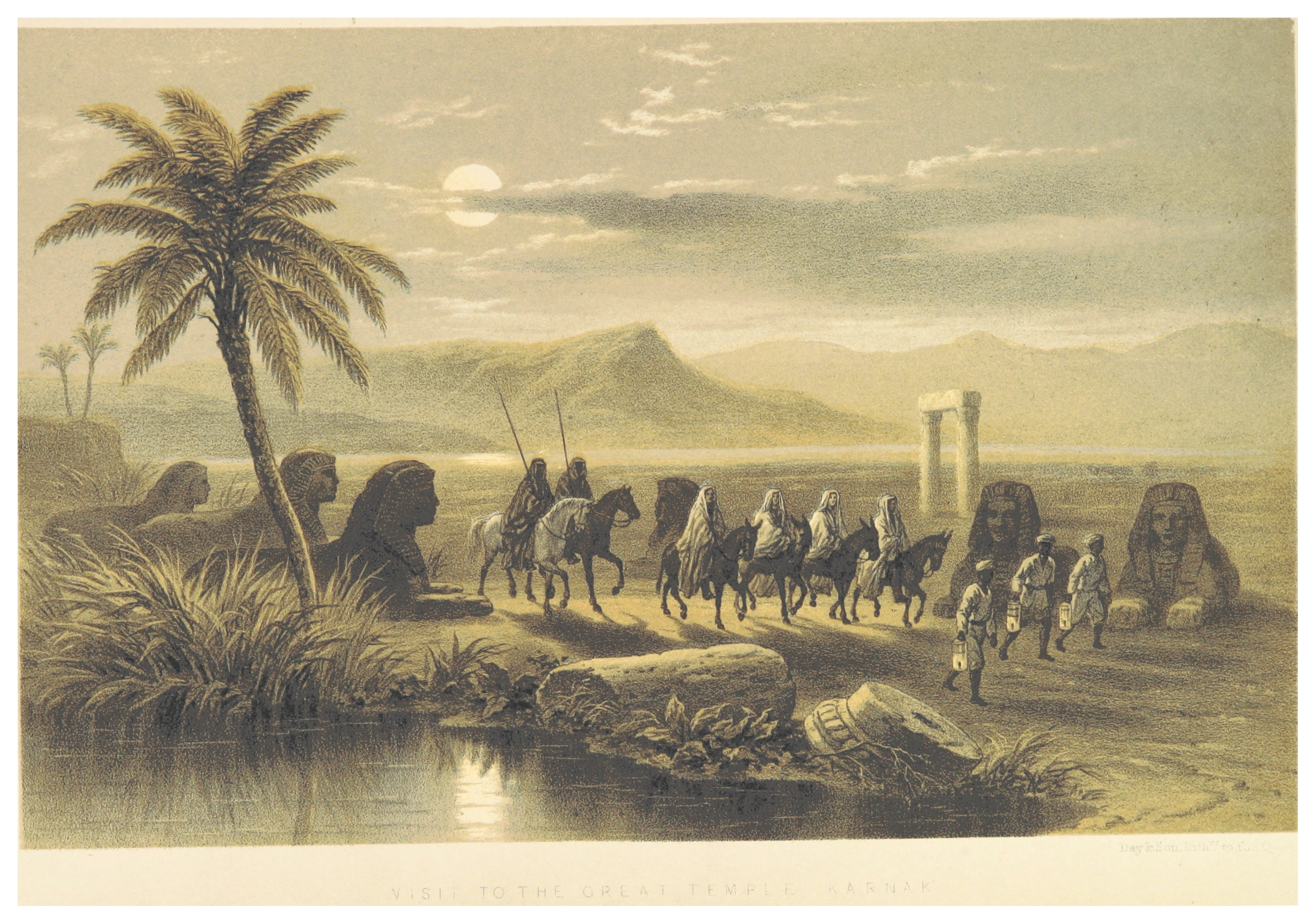
Visite in Karnak, Egypt (January 1861)

Thomas and Catherine had a common interest in travel and in the antiquities of the middle and Near East. Thomas was elected member of the Royal Society of Northern Antiquaries, Copenhagen (1849), a fellow of the Society of Antiquaries of London (1853), and a member of the Royal Irish Academy (1869).

Thomas and Catherine travelled to North Africa, the Levant and Palestine. In February 1856, he lectured in the Athenium (Opera House) on 'Egypt, Past and Present', an account of a visit Cairo and a journey along the Nile. He concluded that the Turkish empire was doomed and speculated on Egypt's future.

George Kelleher has suggested, however, that while Thomas Tobin was an 'antiquarian and curio collector in the spirit of the Victorian age', his wife Catherine, 'was a far more considerable cultural figure'. Her interest in antiquaries led her to write two books, "Shadows of the East" (Longmans, 1855) and "The Land of Inheritance" (Quaritch, London, 1863), and to translate a third "Illustration of Discoveries at Nineveh" (Longmans, 1859) by Paul-Émile Botta.

== Activity in Cork ==
Thomas was very involved in many aspects of the social and commercial life of the Cork area. He was patron of Carrigrohane Church of Ireland Primary School. He was also a Justice of the Peace as well as being Deputy Lieutenant of the county of the City of Cork. Like his father, who was a member of the Dock Committee in Liverpool, Thomas was a member of Cork Harbour Board.

He had greatest influence during the 1850s when he was "one of the most active members" of the Executive Committee which organised the Cork Exhibition of 1852. He was also Secretary of the Police Committee, which organised security for the Exhibition. His carriage was one of the fifty which rode in the parade at the opening of the Exhibition Knighthood.

The profits of the Cork Exhibition were used to build the Atheneum (Opera House). Thomas was President of the Atheneum and at its opening on 22 May 1855, he was knighted by the Lord Lieutenant. The Earl of Carlisle said "In recognition of the services he has rendered for the institution, of the great esteem in which he was held by the citizens of Cork but particularly in reference for the vast goods and great benefits he has dispensed to the public in the conduct of the large manufactory at Ballincollig and especially for his kindness and humanity to the numerous workers over whom he has charge." Hospitals

Thomas took an active interest in the management of a number of the city hospitals. Two of these were the Erinville Hospital and the Eglinton District Lunatic Asylum along the Lee Road. In 1874, he presided over a public meeting, which was called to organise a new hospital for Cork. This was "The County and City of Cork Hospital for Women and Children" which later became the Victoria Hospital. Thomas was elected to the permanent Committee of Management in 1877. He was appointed Honorary Treasurer and Secretary in 1878 and served in this capacity until his death in 1881. His wife, Lady Catherine, was a patroness of the Hospital for many years.

Tobin's collection of Irish Bronze Age antiquities, that was mostly found in the area around Cork, was purchased by the British Museum in 1871.

== Death ==
Thomas died on 9 January 1881. He had been sick for ten weeks with a gastric ulcer and his brother, James Aspinall, was present at his death. He was buried at Inniscarra Cemetery on 11 January.

The Cork Examiner said on his death: "Much regret was felt at the announcement of the death of the courteous and popular gentleman, Sir Thomas Tobin. He was not a native of this city but for a long time had identified himself with it. By political conviction he was a Conservative but his opinions were always maintained in the courteous and least obtrusive manner and they detracted nothing from the esteem which his urbane manners and general kindness of disposition had won for him." (In his will he left effects in Ireland valued at £5,305.7s.2d.)

After his death his wife, Lady Catherine, moved back to England, first to London and then to Eastham in Cheshire where James Aspinall lived. She died there on 23 April 1903, and was buried in Eastham.

The memory of Sir Thomas Tobin is largely forgotten in Ballincollig today. Yet he played a very important part in the development of the town in the middle of the last century. He was for many years the managing director of one of the largest manufactories in the south of Ireland. He also played a very important part in the cultural life of Cork City at that time. His grave lies at the end of Inniscarra Graveyard.

== Arms ==
Coat of arms of Thomas Tobin

Notes
Confirmed 17 August 1855 by Sir John Bernard Burke, Ulster King of Arms.
Crest
On a mount Vert a falcon rising Proper belled Or and charged on each wing with a nettle leaf also Proper.
Escutcheon
Vert a knight's helmet Proper between three nettle leaves pointing downwards Or.
Motto
Noli Me Tangere
