= Modikwe Dikobe =

Deceased writer and activist in South Africa

Modikwe Dikobe (pseudonym of Marks Rammitloa, 1913 – July 2005) was a South African novelist, poet, trade unionist and squatter leader in Johannesburg, in the 1940s. He wrote one book and one collection of poetry, whilst working as a hawker, clerk, domestic servant and night watchman.

== Early life ==
Dikobe was born in Mutse village, in north-central Transvaal. When he was young his mother went to Johannesburg to work and he lived with his grandmother, looking after goats. When he was nine he moved to Sophiatown in the city to be with his mother. Then they moved to a shack in Doornfontein. He learnt to read and write, as well as being introduced to leftwing ideas, by the Communist Party’s Mayibuye night-schools in the 1930s.

== Activism ==
His first job was selling newspapers and this is how he met his future wife, Ruth. They married in 1936 and lived in Newclare and Sophiatown, before moving to the Alexandra township. In the early 1940s, Dikobe began to organise tenants' movements and bus boycotts, alongside other people such as Schreiner Baduza and James Mpanza.

Owing to the high rents, people began to squat in the veld. Dikobe joined them and became a squatter leader. He wrote for a newspaper called Inkululeko ('Freedom'). The police arrested Dikobe alongside many other people in 1960. He was quickly released, but forbidden from being associated with politics or trade unions. In 1963, he took a job as a nightwatchman and began to write his book The Marabi Dance about shackdwellers in Doornfontein. Dikobe then left his wife and moved to Seabe in (modern-day Mpumalanga) with another woman.

== Legacy ==
Literary historian Tim Couzens, editor of Dikobe's volume of poetry, Dispossessed, states that "Dikobe is unique in South African literature because he has been until recently [...] the only substantial writer who is, while writing, fairly strongly working class."

== Works ==
- The Marabi Dance [novel] (1973)
- The Dispossessed [poetry] (1983)
