= St. Uriel's Episcopal Church =

Saint Uriel's Episcopal Church
- Church of Saint Uriel the Archangel
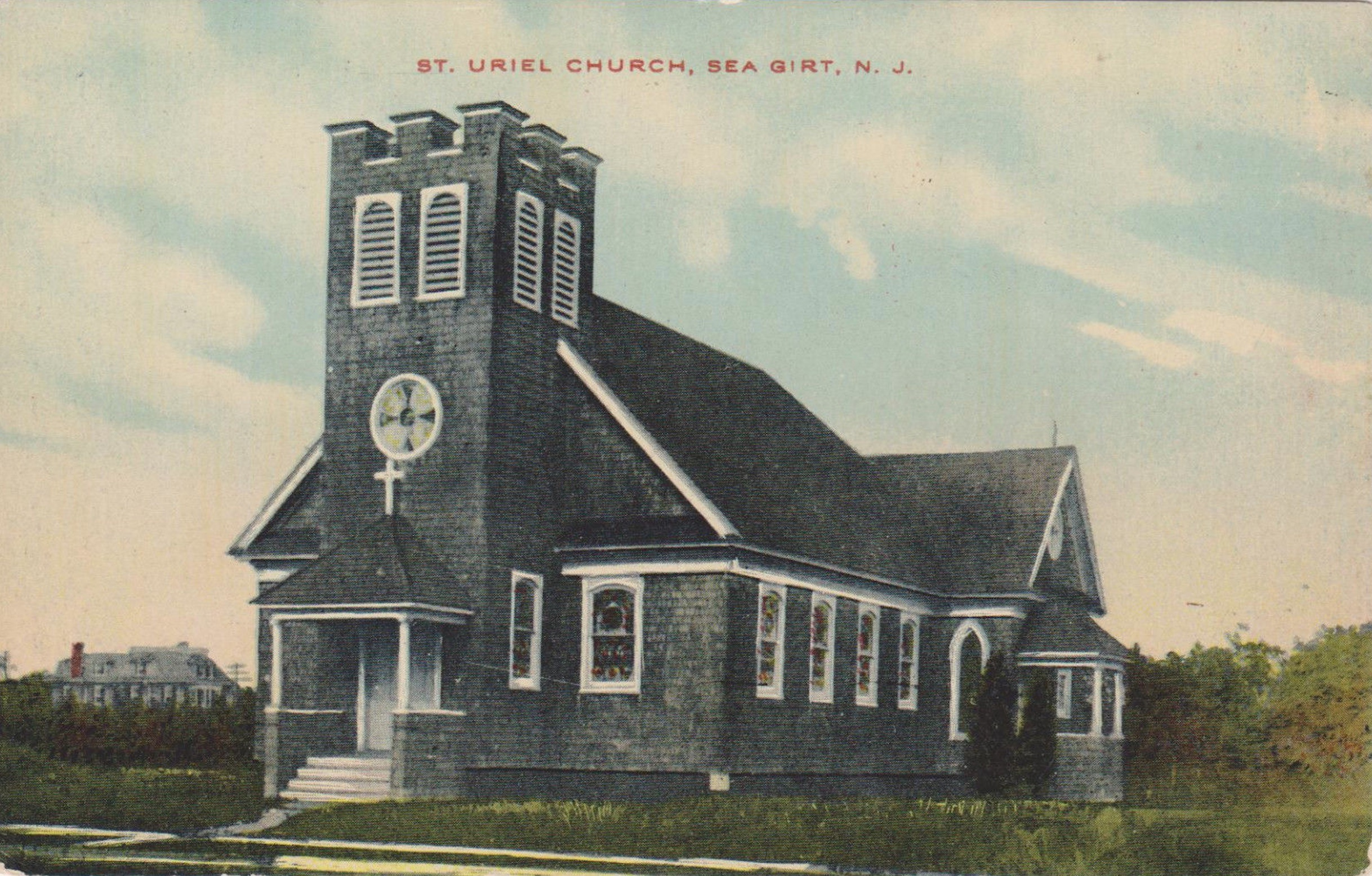
- The church in 1900–1910s
- Saint Uriel's Episcopal Church
- 40°7′55.9″N 74°2′4.6″W
- Location: Sea Girt, Monmouth, New Jersey
- Country: United States
- Denomination: Episcopal
- Churchmanship: Anglo-Catholic
- Website: www.sturielsg.org

History
- Status: Church
- Dedication: Uriel the Archangel
- Consecrated: July 25, 1907

Architecture
- Functional status: Active
- Style: Queen Anne Revival
- Groundbreaking: 1903
- Completed: before 1920

Administration
- Province: Province II
- Diocese: New Jersey

Clergy
- Bishop: Sally French

St. Uriel's Episcopal Church, also known as Church of St. Uriel the Archangel, or simply St. Uriel's, is an Episcopal church in Sea Girt, New Jersey. The church is an operating member of the Anglican Communion, and is aligned with the Anglo-Catholic churchmanship of Anglicanism. A history of the church by James B. Simpson entitled Regent of the Sun was published in 1988, on the occasion of the 85th anniversary of its founding.

The church reported 398 members in 2020 and 129 members in 2025. Plate and pledge income reported for the congregation in 2025 was $186,532 with average Sunday attendance (ASA) of 65 persons.

The parish banner was made by the Sisters of Bethany and dedicated at the church in 1958. Until that year, the church in Sea Girt was the only Anglican house of worship dedicated to the Archangel Uriel. It remains the only Episcopal church in the United States named after Saint Uriel the Archangel.
