= Homily on the Archangel Uriel =

Ethiopian homiliary for Archangel Uriel

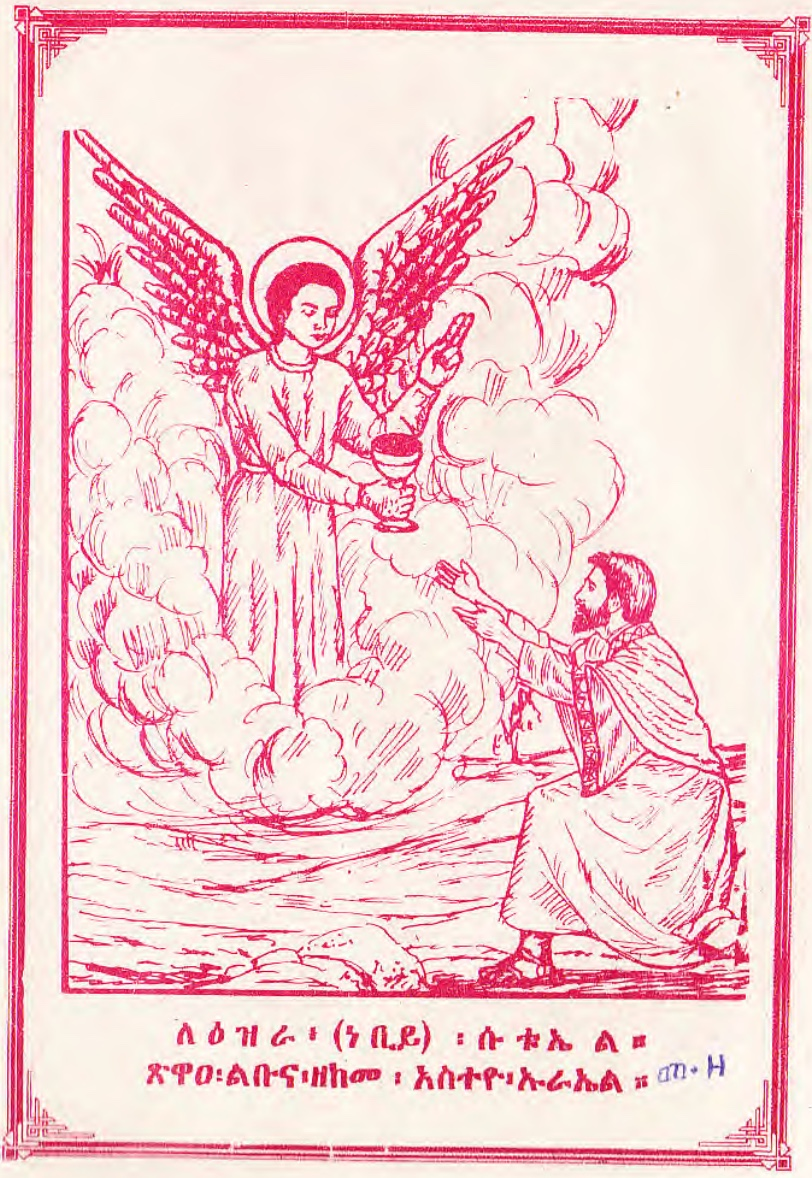
Illustration depicting the Archangel Uriel holding a chalice, from the Dersana Urael published in Amharic.

The Homily on the Archangel Uriel (Ge'ez: ድርሳነ ዑራኤል, romanized: Dǝrsanä ʿUraʾel, lit. 'Homiliary on Uriel' or 'The Sermon of Urael') is an Ethiopian homiliary containing a collection of miracles and sermons in honour of the Archangel Uriel.

The homiliary itself belongs to a larger collection of homilies dedicated to the angels (Dǝrsanä mälaʾǝkt). It is attested in two Ge'ez manuscripts, namely the earlier 'short' recension (EMML 1835) and the later 'long' recension (EMML 1841), both preserved in the monastic library of Däbrä Ḥayq. The earlier one was copied during the reign of Emperor Zara Yaqob (1434–1468), while the other has been dated to the seventeenth century on palaeographic grounds. The veneration of Uriel seems to have become more popular after Zara Yaqob, the first church in Ethiopia dedicated to him was built by Emperor Na'od (reigned 1494–1508).

The Old Testament apocryphal books, 4 Ezra and 1 Enoch (both are considered canonical by the Ethiopian Orthodox Tewahedo Church), serve as the primary base for the homiliary. In general, it depicts Uriel as one of the great archangels, and as the angelus interpres who has interpreted prophecies to Enoch and Ezra, and the helper of both of them.

The homiliary is influential over the Ethiopian Orthodox Tewahedo Church traditions about the Archangel Uriel, it comprises dozens of homilies and miracles attested in more than thirteen manuscripts. The miracle story of A Miracle of the Archangel Uriel Worked for Abba Giyorgis of Gasǝč̣č̣a is taken from the Dǝrsanä ʿUraʾel. According to the Dǝrsanä, at the time of the Crucifixion of Jesus, Uriel dipped his wing in the blood and water flowing from Christ's flank and filled a vessel (cup) with it. Carrying the cup, he fled to Ethiopia and sprinkled the blood on many places to sanctify them for building churches. Thus Uriel is often depicted carrying a chalice filled with the blood of Christ in Ethiopian Orthodox iconography.
