= Auriol =

Auriol may refer to:

== People ==
=== Surname ===
- Charles Joseph Auriol (1778–1834), Swiss landscape painter
- Didier Auriol (born 1958), French rally driver and World Rally Champion
- Emmanuelle Auriol (born 1966), French economist
- George Auriol (1863–1938), alias of Jean-Georges Huyot, French poet, songwriter, painter, graphic designer, illustrator, and type designer
- Hubert Auriol (1952–2021), French racing driver and former director of the Paris-Dakar Rally
- Jacqueline Auriol (1917–2000) née Jacqueline Douet, French aviator who set several world speed records
- Jean-Baptiste Auriol (1806–1881), French circus performer
- Jean George Auriol (1907–1950), French film critic and screenwriter
- Peter Auriol (c. 1280 – 1322), also known as Pierre Auriol and Petrus Aureolus, medieval Franciscan theologian and philosopher
- Vincent Auriol (1884–1966), French politician who served as first President of the Fourth Republic from 1947 to 1954

=== Given name ===
- Auriol Batten (1918–2015), South African botanical illustrator
- Auriol Dongmo (born 1990), Cameroonian/Portuguese athlete
- Auriol Guillaume (born 1979), French footballer
- Auriol Lee (1880–1941), British stage actress
- Auriol Smith (born 1936), English actress and theatre director

== Other uses ==
- Auriol, Bouches-du-Rhône, a town in southern France
- Auriol Island, an island in Myanmar
- Auriol Kensington Rowing Club, a rowing club in Hammersmith, west London, England
- Auriol, Mississippi, fictitious home of Blanche DuBois in the film A Streetcar Named Desire
- Auriol, a novel by William Harrison Ainsworth
- Auriol (typeface), a typeface

== See also ==
- Oriel (disambiguation)
- Oriol
