= Oriel Monongoaha =

South African activist

Oriel Monongoaha was a South African activist. In the 1940s, Monongoaha became a squatter leader in Orlando West, like Schreiner Baduza in Alexandra township and Abel Ntoi in Pimville. After land invasions occurred, he helped to protect them against eviction and at the Tobruk camp took on a juridical battle, hiring two law firms and four lawyers. Observing the United Party's attempts to repress squatting he commented it was like a farmer trying to rid his land of birds: "he chases the birds from one part of his field and they alight in another part".
