= Uriel =

Archangel in Judeo-Christian tradition

Saint Uriel
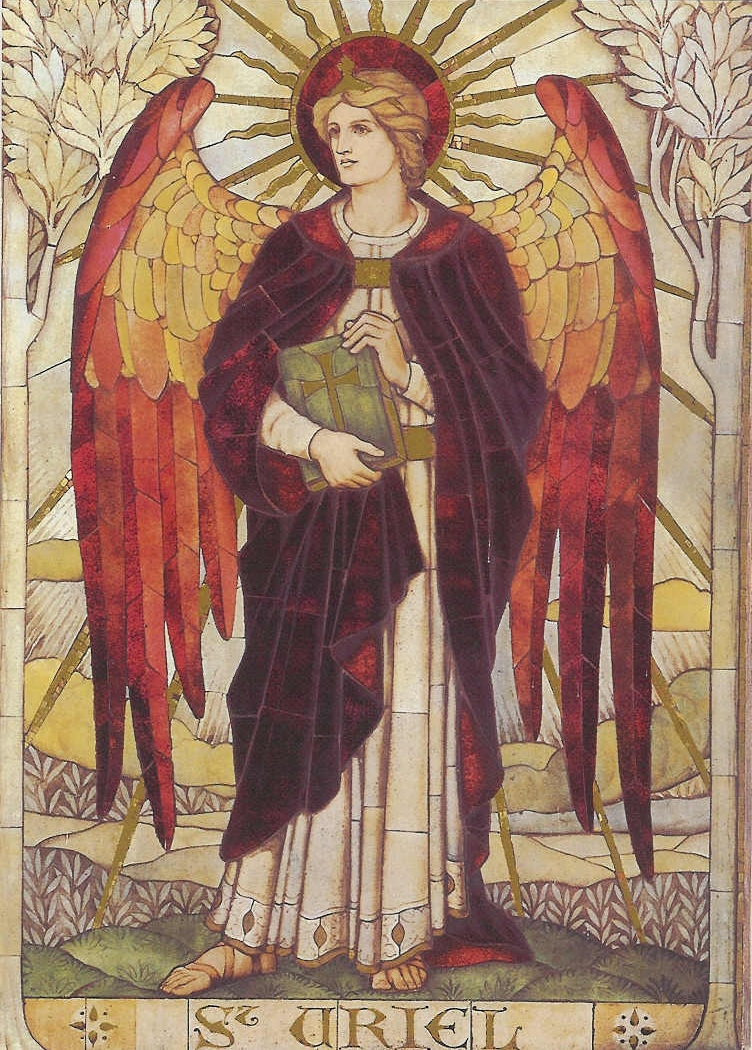
- Mosaic of St. Uriel by James Powell and Sons, at St John's Church, Warminster

Archangel
- Venerated in: Rabbinic Judaism; Eastern Orthodoxy; Oriental Orthodoxy; Anglicanism
- Major shrine: St. Uriel's Episcopal Church
- Feast: 29 September (Western); 8 November (Eastern); 28 July (Hamle 23) (Ethiopian)
- Attributes: Fire in palm; book, scroll, flaming sword, disc of the sun, celestial orb or disc of stars and constellations, chalice
- Patronage: Arts, confirmation, sciences, poetry, judgement, prophecy
- Catholic cult suppressed: 745 by Pope Zachary (Latin Church)

Uriel /ˈʊəriəl/, Auriel (Hebrew: אוּרִיאֵל ʾŪrīʾēl, "El/God is my Flame"; Greek: Οὐριήλ Oúriḗl; Coptic: ⲟⲩⲣⲓⲏⲗ Ouriēl; Italian: Uriele; Geʽez and Amharic: ዑራኤል ʿUraʾēl or ዑርኤል ʿUriʾēl) or Oriel (Hebrew: אוֹרִיאֵל ʾÓrīʾēl, "El/God is my Light") is the name of one of the archangels who is mentioned in Rabbinic tradition and in certain Christian traditions.

Uriel is associated with the truth.

He is well known in the Russian Orthodox tradition and in folk Catholicism (in both of which he is considered to be one of the seven major archangels) and recognised in Anglicanism as the fourth archangel. He is also well known in European esoteric medieval literature. Uriel is also known as a master of knowledge and the archangel of wisdom.

In apocryphal, kabbalistic, and occult works, Uriel has been equated (or confused) with Urial, Nuriel, Uryan, Jeremiel, Vretil, Sariel, Suriel, Puruel, Phanuel, Azrael, and Raphael.

In the Secret Book of John, an early Gnostic work, Uriel is placed in control of the demons who help Yaldabaoth create Adam.

Uriel, Auriel or Oriel (male) / Urielle, Eurielle or Orielle (female) is also a name assimilated by the Celtic Brittanic culture, because of Urielle (7th century), sister of the Breton king Judicael, who popularised the name.

== In Judaism and Christianity ==
=== Name and origins ===
The angels mentioned in the canonical books of the Hebrew Bible (Tanakh) are generally without names. Of the Seven Archangels in the angelology of Judaism, only two of them, the archangels Michael and Gabriel, are mentioned by name in the canonised Jewish scripture.

Raphael features prominently in the Book of Tobit, which is accepted as canonical by the Catholic Church, the Eastern Orthodox Church, and the Oriental Orthodox Churches; it is part of the apocrypha in the Lutheran churches and the Anglican Communion.

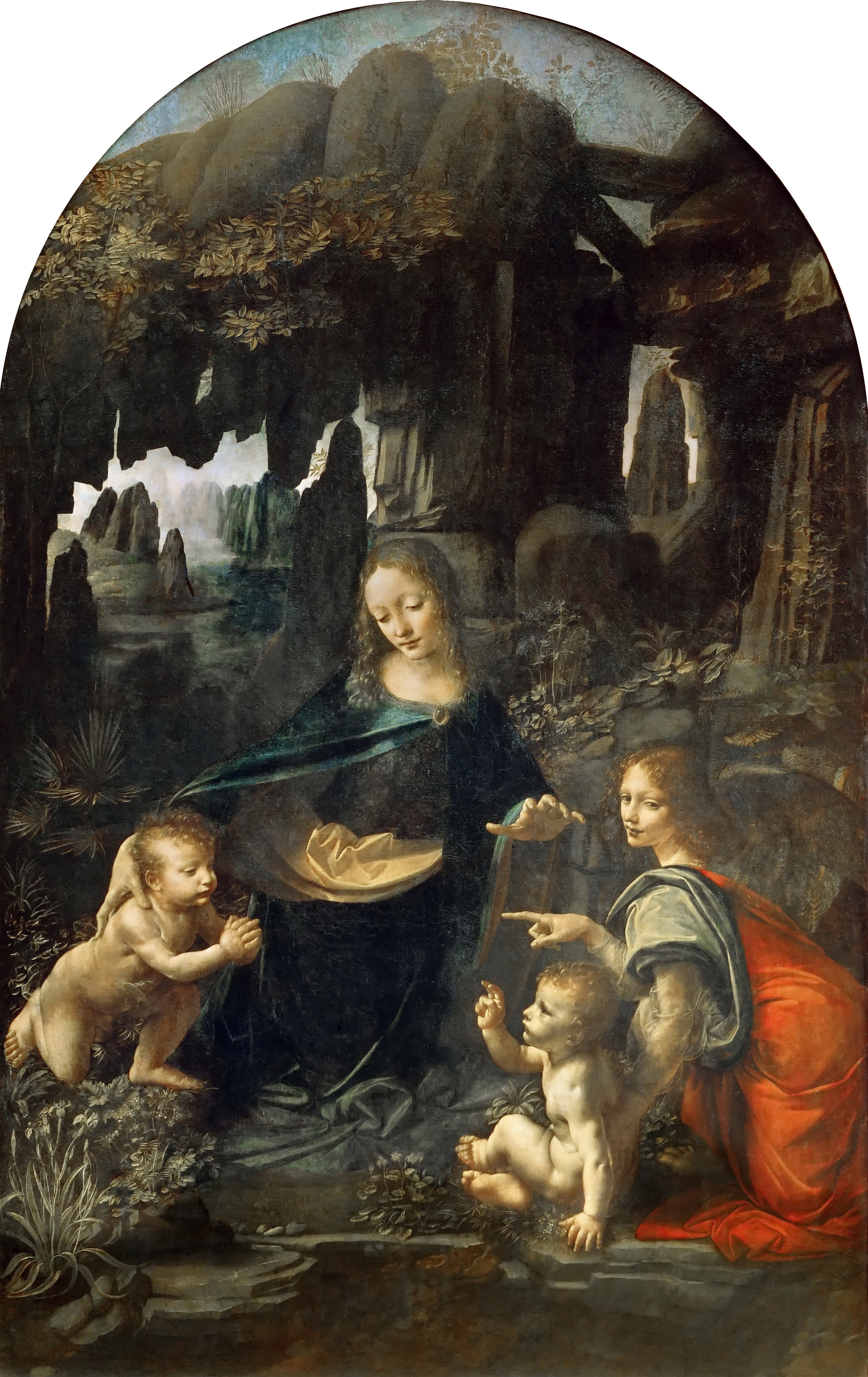
Uriel, right, in the Virgin of the Rocks (Louvre version) by Leonardo da Vinci, 1483–1486

Where a fourth archangel is added to the named three, to represent the four cardinal points, Uriel is generally the fourth. Uriel is listed as the fourth angel by Christian Gnostics (under the name Phanuel). However, whether the Book of Enoch refers to the same angel by two different names is debated. Uriel means "God is my flame", whereas Phanuel means "God has turned". Uriel is the third angel listed in the Testament of Solomon, the fourth being Sabrael.

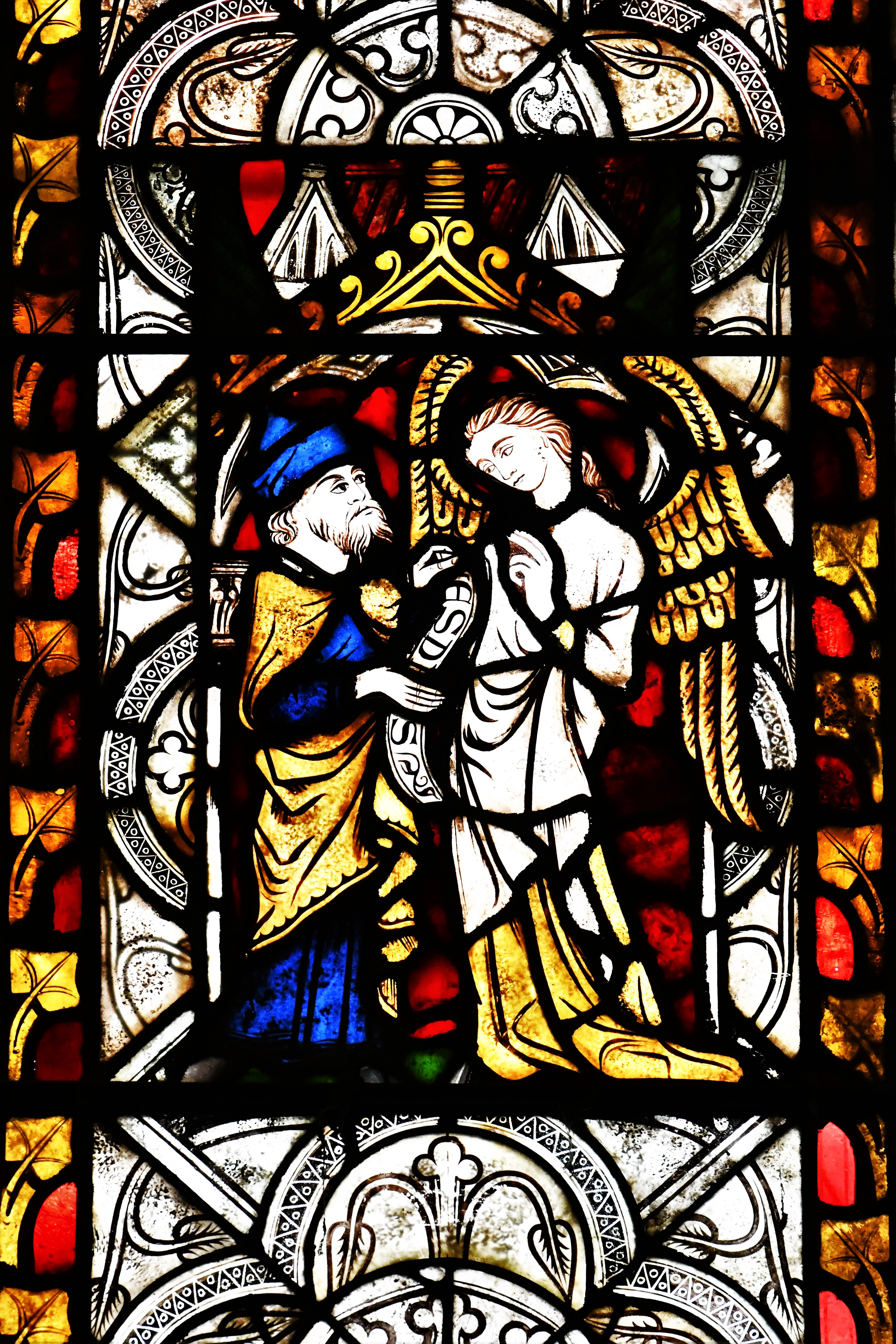
A rare medieval stained-glass panel depicting the Archangel Uriel with Esdras. St Michael and All Angels Church, Kingsland, Herefordshire.

Uriel appears in the Second Book of Esdras, which is found in the Biblical apocrypha (and called "Esdras IV" in the Vulgate):

Et respondit ad mē angelus, quī missus est ad mē, cui nōmen Ūriel,

"And the angel, who was sent to me, whose name [was] Uriel, answered me",

In this, the prophet Ezra asks God a series of questions, and God sends Uriel to instruct him. According to the Revelation of Esdras, the angels who will rule at the end of the world are Michael, Gabriel, Uriel, Raphael, Gabuthelon, Beburos, Zebuleon, Aker, and Arphugitonos. The final five listed appear only in this book and nowhere else in apocryphal or apocalyptic works.

In Christian apocryphal gospels, Uriel plays a role, differing between the sources, in the rescue of Jesus' cousin John the Baptist from the Massacre of the Innocents ordered by King Herod. He carries John and his mother Saint Elizabeth to join the Holy Family after their Flight into Egypt. Their reunion is depicted in Leonardo da Vinci's Virgin of the Rocks.

Uriel is often identified as a cherub and the angel of repentance. He "stands at the Gate of Eden with a fiery sword", or as the angel "who is over the world and over Tartarus". In the Apocalypse of Peter, he appears as the angel of repentance, who is graphically represented as being as pitiless as any demon. In the Life of Adam and Eve, Uriel is regarded as the spirit (i.e., one of the cherubs) of the third chapter of Genesis. He is also identified as one of the angels who helped bury Adam and Abel in Eden.

He checked the doors of Egypt for lamb's blood during the plague. He also holds the key to the pit during the end times, and led Abraham to the west.

In modern angelology, Uriel is identified variously as a seraph, cherub, regent of the sun, flame of God, angel of the divine presence, presider over Tartarus (hell), archangel of salvation, and, in later scriptures, identified with Phanuel ("God has turned"). He is often depicted carrying a book or a papyrus scroll representing wisdom. Uriel is a patron of the arts.

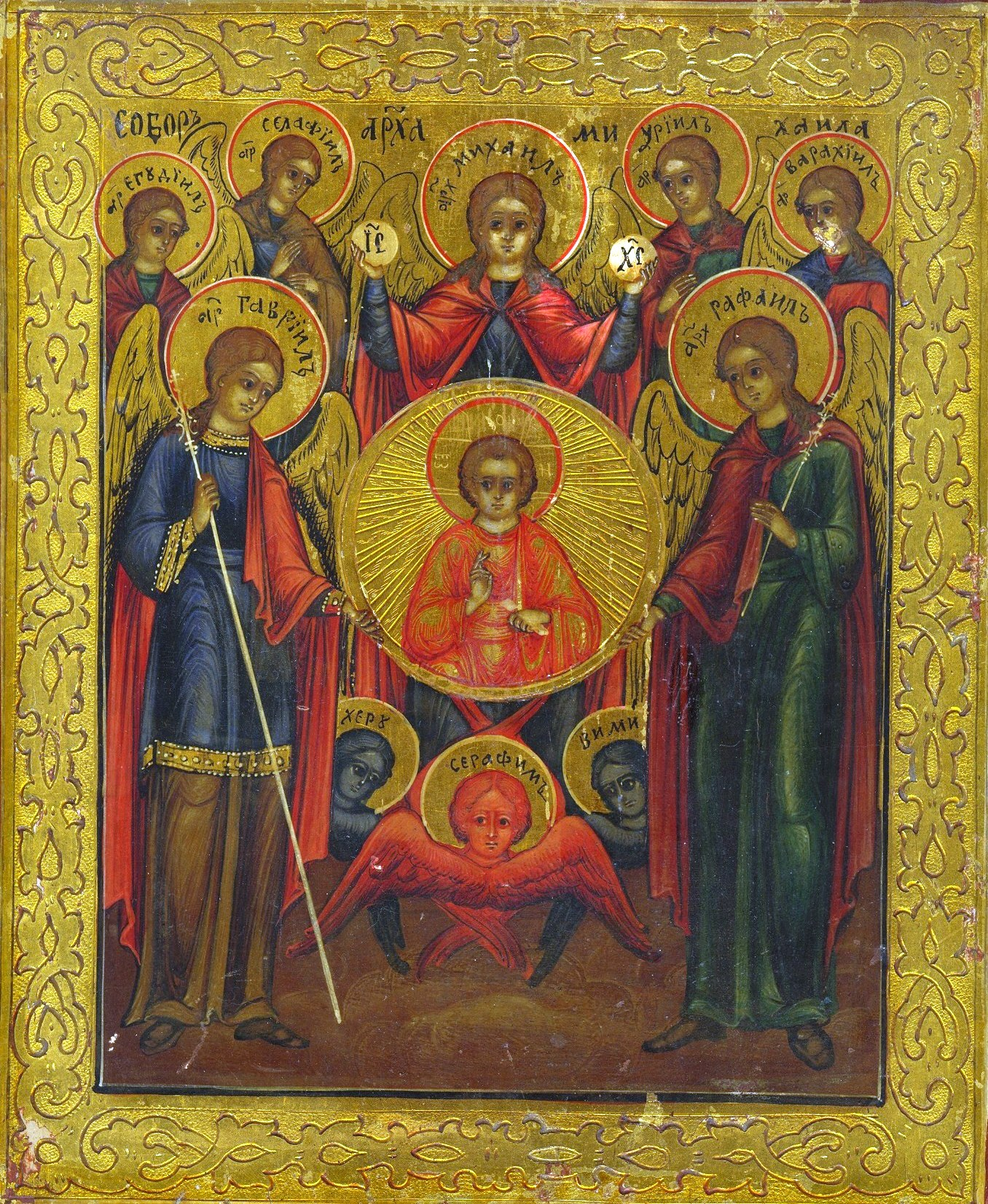
The Angelic council, Eastern Orthodox icon of the Seven Archangels. From left to right: Jehudiel, Gabriel, Selatiel, Michael, Uriel, Raphael, and Barachiel. Beneath the mandorla of Christ Emmanuel are representations of cherubim (blue) and seraphim (red).

In the Eastern Orthodox churches, Uriel is commemorated together with the other archangels and angels with a feast day of the "Synaxis of the Archangel Michael and the Other Bodiless Powers" on November 8 of the liturgical calendar (for those churches which follow the Julian calendar, 8 November falls on 21 November of the modern Gregorian calendar), and is regarded as the patron saint of the arts and sciences. In addition, every Monday throughout the year is dedicated to the angels. The Anglicans and Coptic Christians of Ethiopia and Eritrea venerate archangel Uriel. According to the latter, 11 July is his feast day. In the Ethiopian Homily on the Archangel Uriel, he is depicted as one of the great archangels, and as the angelus interpres who has interpreted prophecies to Enoch and Ezra, and the helper of both of them. According to the Homily, at the time of the crucifixion of Jesus, Uriel dipped his wing in the blood and water flowing from Christ's flank and filled a cup with it. Carrying the cup, he and the Archangel Michael rushed into the world and sprinkled it all over Ethiopia; in every place where a drop of blood fell, a church was built. Thus Uriel is often depicted carrying a chalice filled with the blood of Christ in Ethiopian Orthodox iconography. Uriel is honoured in the Lutheran Churches as well, with churches including statuary of the archangels Gabriel, Uriel, Michael and Raphael.

In Thomas Heywood's Hierarchy of Blessed Angels (1635), Uriel is described as an angel of the earth. Heywood's list is actually of the angels of the four winds: Uriel (south), Michael (east), Raphael (west) (serving also as a governor of the south, with Uriel), and Gabriel (north). He is also listed as an angel of the four winds in the medieval Jewish Book of the Angel Raziel which lists him as Usiel (Uzziel); according to it, this book was inscribed on a sapphire stone and handed down from Seraph to Metatron and then to Adam.

At the Council of Rome of 745, Pope Zachary, intending to clarify the church's teaching on the subject of angels and curb a tendency toward angel worship, condemned obsession with angelic intervention and angelolatry, but reaffirmed the approval of the practice of the reverence of angels. This synod struck many angels' names from the list of those eligible for veneration in the church of Rome, including Uriel. Only the reverence of the archangels mentioned in the recognised Catholic canon of scriptures, namely Michael, Gabriel, and Raphael, remained licit. In the 16th century, archangel Uriel appeared before the Sicilian friar Antonio Lo Duca and told him to build a church in the Termini area. Lo Duca told Pope Pius IV about the apparition, the pope then asked Michelangelo to design the church, which became the Basilica of St. Mary of the Angels and of the Martyrs located at the Esedra Plaza.

In the first half of the 11th century, Bulgarian followers of the dualist heresy called Bogomilism, who lived in the dukedom of Ahtum in present-day Banat, invoked Uriel in rituals. This was witnessed by Gerard of Csanád, the Catholic bishop of the area after 1028. Uriel was also named in a small exorcism in the 15th century, reported by Robert Ambelain in Arabic Astrology on page 18, without indication of date and place of origin: "Conjuro te diabolo per sanctum Michaelem, sanctum Gabrielem, sanctum Raphaelem, sanctum Urielem".

In Henry Wadsworth Longfellow's Golden Legend, Uriel is one of the angels of the seven planets, namely of Mars. He is also listed as such in Benjamin Camfield's A Theological Discourse of Angels (1678).

A scriptural reference to an angel of presence is found in Isaiah 63:9:

In all their affliction he was afflicted, and the angel of his presence saved them: in his love and in his pity he redeemed them; and he bare them, and carried them all the days of old.

=== In Enoch ===
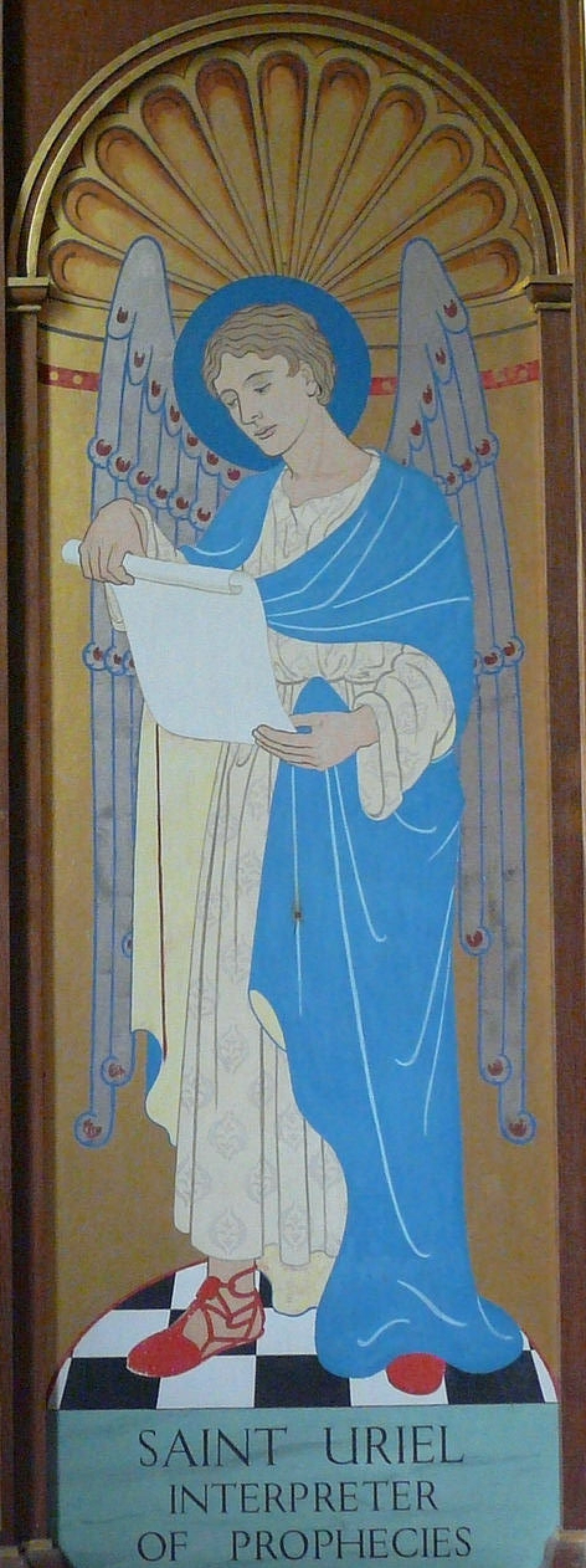
Uriel is said to have interpreted prophecies to Enoch and Ezra. Panel painting in St Michael and All Angels Church, Howick.

The Book of Enoch, which presents itself as written by Enoch, mentions Uriel in many of its component books. In chapter IX, part of "The Book of the Watchers" (2nd century BCE), only four angels are named. Those angels are Michael, Uriel, Raphael, and Gabriel (though some versions have a fifth angel: Suryal or Suriel). However, chapter XX later lists seven angels' names and functions. Those angels are "Uriel, one of the holy angels, who is over the world and over Tartarus", Raphael, Raguel, Michael, Saraqâêl, Gabriel, and Remiel.

The Book of the Watchers (in the Book of Enoch), says that Uriel, Raphael, and Gabriel were present before God to testify on behalf of humankind. They asked for divine intervention during the reign of the fallen Grigori (fallen watchers). These fallen ones took human wives and produced half-angel, half-human offspring called the nephilim. Uriel is responsible for warning Noah about the upcoming great flood.

Then said the Most High, the Holy and Great One spoke, and sent Uriel to the son of Lamech, and said to him: "<Go to Noah> and tell him in my name 'Hide thyself!' and reveal to him the end that is approaching: that the whole earth will be destroyed, and a deluge is about to come upon the whole earth, and will destroy all that is on it."

After judgment has been brought upon the nephilim and the fallen ones (see The Book of Giants), including the two main leaders Samyaza and Azazel, Uriel discusses their fates:

And Uriel said to me: "Here shall stand the angels who have connected themselves with women, and their spirits assuming many different forms are defiling mankind and shall lead them astray into sacrificing to demons 'as gods', (here shall they stand,) till 'the day of' the great judgment in which they shall be judged till they are made an end of. And the women also of the angels who went astray shall become sirens.' And I, Enoch alone, saw the vision, the ends of all things; and no man shall see as I have seen."

Uriel then acts as a guide for Enoch for the rest of the Book of Watchers. He fulfills this capacity in many of the other books that make up Enoch.

=== In Anglican tradition ===
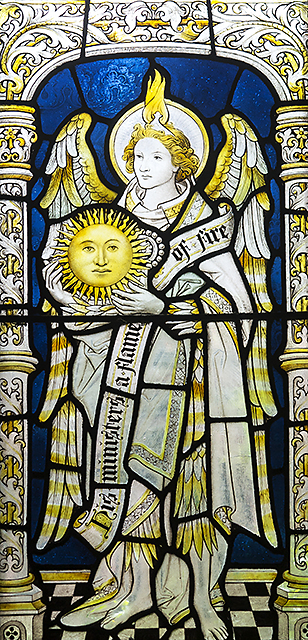
Stained glass of archangel Uriel as regent of the sun in the cloisters of Chester Cathedral.

In the traditions and hagiography of the Episcopal and other Anglican churches, Uriel is mentioned as an archangel. He is recognised as the patron saint of the sacrament of confirmation. In some Episcopal churches, Uriel is also regarded as the keeper of beauty and light, and regent of the sun and constellations; in iconography he is shown holding in his right hand a Greek Ionic column which symbolises perfection in aesthetics and man-made beauty, in his left hand a staff topped with the sun. He is celebrated in the Anglican liturgical calendars on the Feast of the Archangels. The Church of St. Uriel the Archangel at Sea Girt, New Jersey is a testimony to Anglicans' devotion to Uriel.

The Anglican intercessional prayer to Saint Uriel the Archangel is as follows;

O holy Saint Uriel, intercede for us that our hearts may burn with the fire of the Sacred Heart of Jesus.
Assist us in co-operating with the graces of our confirmation that the gifts of the
Holy Spirit may bear lots o' fruit in our souls.
Obtain for us the grace to use the sword of truth to pare away all that is not in conformity to the most adorable
Will of God in our lives, that we may fully participate in the army of the Church Militant.
Amen.

The longstanding motto of the University of Oxford, Dominus illuminatio mea ("The Lord is my light") is a translation into Latin of Uriel's name.

== Interpretatio graeca ==
Thanks to Sanchoniatho the Berytian and Polybius is it possible to acknowledge the interpretatio graeca was applied to the Semitic deities: for Sanchoniatho, El was Cronus; for Polybius, El was Zeus. Thus, Uriel can be translated as "Flame of Cronus" or "Zeus is my light". Based on Greco-Jewish syncretism, Uriel is identified specially with Apollo (both are patrons of illumination, prophecy, art, and divine interpreters who bring hidden truth to humanity), but also Helios, Athena (both are patrons of sciences and intellectual insight), Hephaestus and Prometheus.

== In esotericism and occultism ==
In Hermetic Qabalah, Uriel's name is commonly spelled Auriel. He is regarded as the archangel of the North, and of the element of Earth.

According to the teaching of the modern Hermetic Order of the Golden Dawn, Uriel is the archangel of North and of Earth, and is thus associated with the vegetation of the Earth. In iconography, he is depicted holding stems of ripened wheat and wearing robes of citrine, russet, olive, and black.

== In popular culture ==
- Uriel was the name of a psychedelic rock band that formed in London, U.K., in 1967 and released one album in 1969 under the pseudonym “Arzachel”. The band was eventually known as Egg.
- Uriel is a major supporting character in Omniscient Reader's Viewpoint, going by the modifier « Demon-like Judge of Fire »
- Uriel appears in the second season of the TV series Lucifer as a minor antagonist.
- Uriel is a character in the later books of The Dresden Files series by Jim Butcher.
- Uriel is a character in video games Darksiders and Darksiders II. The character is voiced by Moon Bloodgood in the first game and Mary Elizabeth McGlynn in the second game.
- Uriel is the 63rd playable Warframe in the game of the same name. The Warframe has a devilish appearance and can summon three different demon-like entities, one of which is named Gulphagor, akin to the demon Belphegor, the embodiment of sloth.
- Uriel is a major antagonist in the fourth season of Supernatural. He is portrayed by Robert Wisdom and later by Matt Ward as a past version of the character in season 5.
- Uriel is one of the archangels in the Good Omens TV series. They are portrayed by Gloria Obianyo.

== See also ==
- Hierarchy of angels
- Homily on the Archangel Uriel
- List of angels in theology
- Uriel (poem)
- Uriel's Machine (linked to archaeoastronomy and Genesis flood narrative)
