= Uriel (poem) =

Poem by Ralph Waldo Emerson

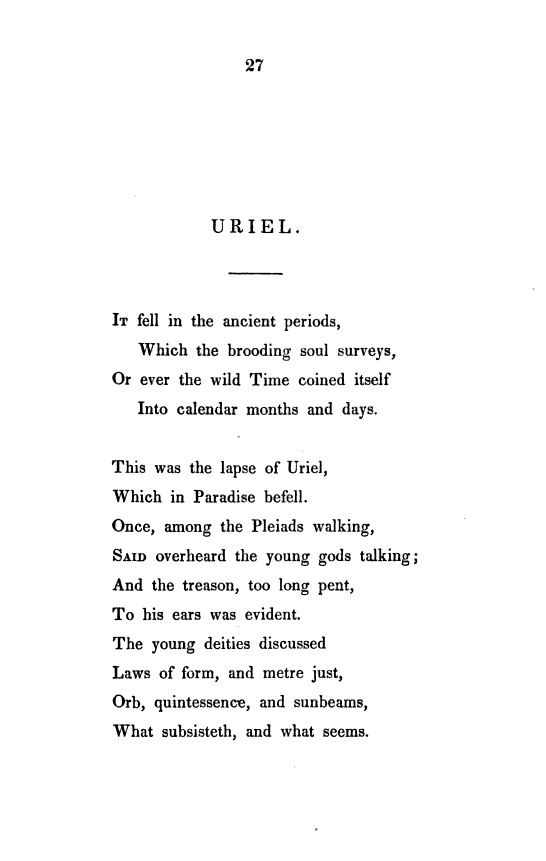
The first page of "Uriel" as it appears in Poems (1847)

"Uriel" is a poem by American writer Ralph Waldo Emerson.

== Overview ==
The poem, describing the "lapse" of Uriel, is regarded as a "poetic summary of many strains of thought in Emerson's early philosophy".

"Once, among the Pleiads walking, Said overheard the young gods talking; And the treason, too long pent, To his ears was evident. The young deities discussed Laws of form, and metre just, Orb, quintessence, and sunbeams."

The leader of the speculating young is Uriel, who with "low tones" and "piercing eye" preaches against the presence of lines in nature, thus introducing the idea of progress and the eternal return. A shudder runs through the sky at these words, and "all slid to confusion".

Steven E. Whicher has speculated that the poem is autobiographical, inspired by Emerson's shock at the unfavorable reception of the "Divinity School Address".

F. O. Matthiessen focused instead on the philosophical content of the poem, arguing that "the conflict between the angel-doctrine of 'line' and Uriel's doctrine of 'round' is identical to the antithesis of 'Understanding' and 'Reason' which, under different aspects, was the burden of most of Emerson's early essays" (74). The topic of lines and circles has also been discussed by Sherman Paul (18-23 for lines and 98-102 for circles).

Robert Frost called "Uriel" "the greatest Western poem yet" in his essay "On Emerson". He also alluded to it in A Masque of Reason and "Build Soil".
