= Oriol Combarros =

Spanish gymnast

- Full name: Oriol Combarros Vilaseca
- Born: 12 May 1980 (age 46) Barcelona, Spain
- Height: 1.67 m (5 ft 6 in)

Gymnastics career
- Discipline: Men's artistic gymnastics
- Country represented: Spain
- Club: Salentina

Oriol Combarros Vilaseca (born 12 May 1980) is a Spanish gymnast. He competed at the 2004 Summer Olympics.
