= Fernand Oriol =

French rower

Personal information
- Full name: Fernand Émile Oriol
- Nationality: French
- Born: 4 November 1900; Paris, France
- Died: 12 January 1989 (aged 88); Maisons-Laffitte, France
- Relatives: André Oriol (brother)

Sport
- Sport: Rowing

Fernand Émile Oriol (4 November 1900 – 12 January 1989) was a French rower. He competed in the men's eight event at the 1924 Summer Olympics alongside his brother André.
