= Uriel Waizel =

Mexican radio personality

Uriel Waizel (born September 18, 1973 in Mexico City) is a music critic and radio broadcaster.

== See also ==
- List of Mexican Jews
