= André Oriol =

French rower

Personal information
- Full name: André Émile Oriol
- Nationality: French
- Born: 26 May 1902; Paris, France
- Died: 17 April 1994 (aged 91); Paris, France
- Relatives: Fernand Oriol (brother)

Sport
- Sport: Rowing

André Émile Oriol (26 May 1902 – 17 April 1994) was a French rower. He competed in the men's eight event at the 1924 Summer Olympics alongside his brother Fernand.
