= Uriel Yitzhaki =

Israeli diplomat

Uriel Yitzhaki (Hebrew: אוריאל יצחקי; born 1949) is an Israeli diplomat. He formerly served as the consul of Israel serving in The Hague. On April 20, 2005, he was arrested at Ben Gurion Airport near Tel Aviv for allegedly issuing more than 150 passports in return for bribes.
