= Oriol Sàbat =

Spanish visual artist and poet

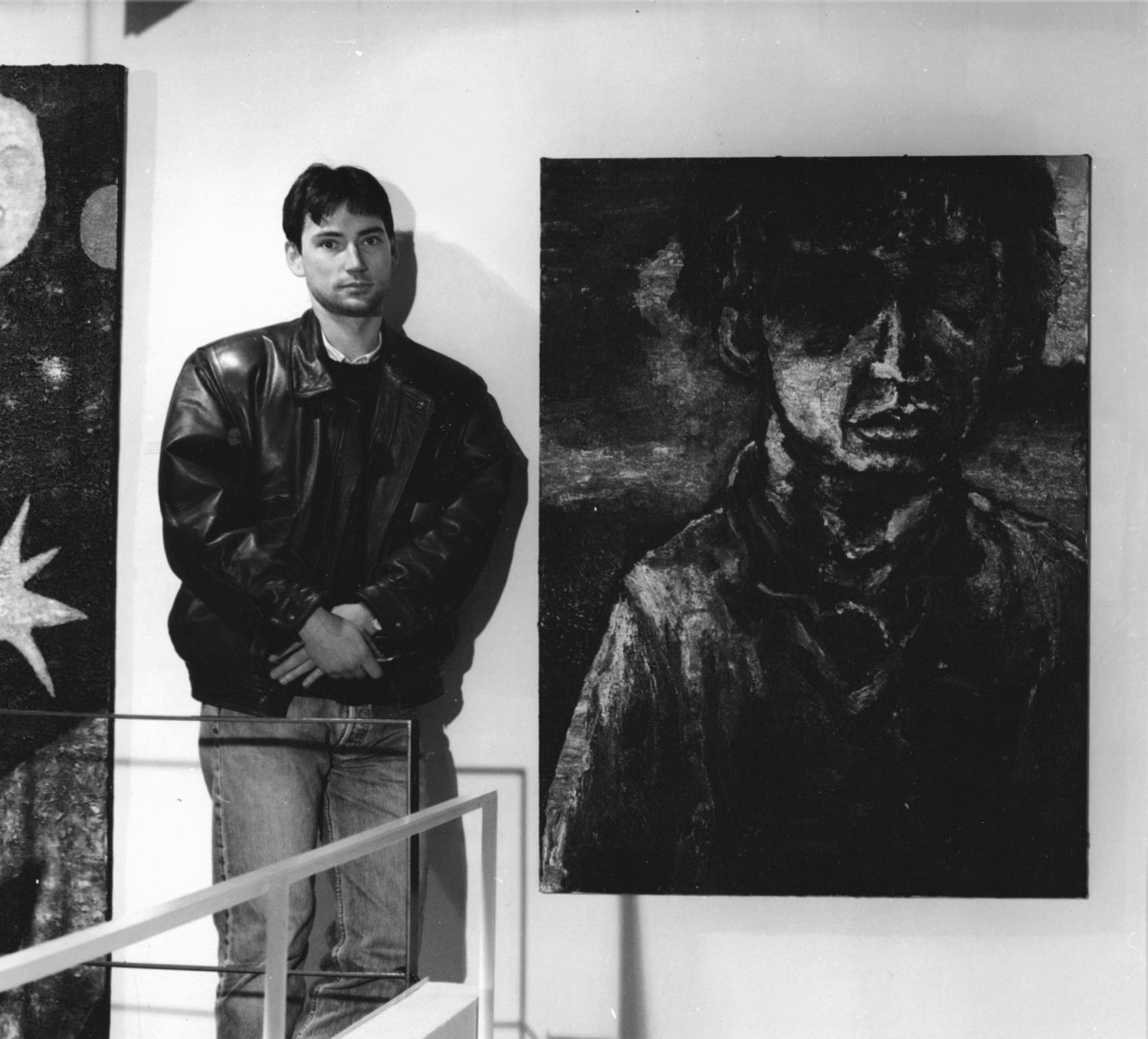
- Oriol Sàbat at Galeria Montcada, Barcelona, 1994
- Born: September 2, 1967 (age 58); Barcelona, Spain
- Education: University of Barcelona (BFA, Engraving)
- Known for: Painting, sculpture, engraving, poetry
- Notable work: Els somnis del xaman; L'escletxa d'un somni; Oriol Sàbat (monograph and film)
- Style: Gestural abstraction; poetic symbolism
- Movement: Expressionism; Symbolism
- Awards: Premi Nacional de Pintura Juan Ramón Masoliver (2000); Barceló Foundation Prize (1999)

Oriol Sàbat (born 2 September 1967) is a Catalan visual artist and poet whose multidisciplinary work spans painting, sculpture, engraving and literature. Active since the late 1980s, he has held more than thirty solo exhibitions in Spain, Belgium and Mexico, and was the subject of a career retrospective at the Biblioteca de Catalunya in 2024. Critics including José Corredor-Matheos, Àlex Mitrani, Lourdes Cirlot, Albert Mercadé and Valentí Gómez i Oliver have analyzed his symbolic and gestural approach, describing it as "a pictorial combustion between symbol and material". He has also published prose and poetry, including Històries d’un desgavell (2008).

== Early life and education ==
Sàbat was born in Barcelona in 1967 and raised in a Catalan household. He studied at the progressive Pere Vergés – Garbí school during the final years of Francoist Spain and trained at Acadèmia El Taller (1980–1984) and Acadèmia Chelsea (1985–1986). He later specialized in engraving at the Escola Internacional de Gravat in Calella. In 1987, he received a scholarship to study at the Scuola del Convento di San Francesco in Sermoneta, Italy, supported by the Italian Ministry of Foreign Affairs. He graduated with a degree in Fine Arts (engraving) from the University of Barcelona in 1991.

== Career ==
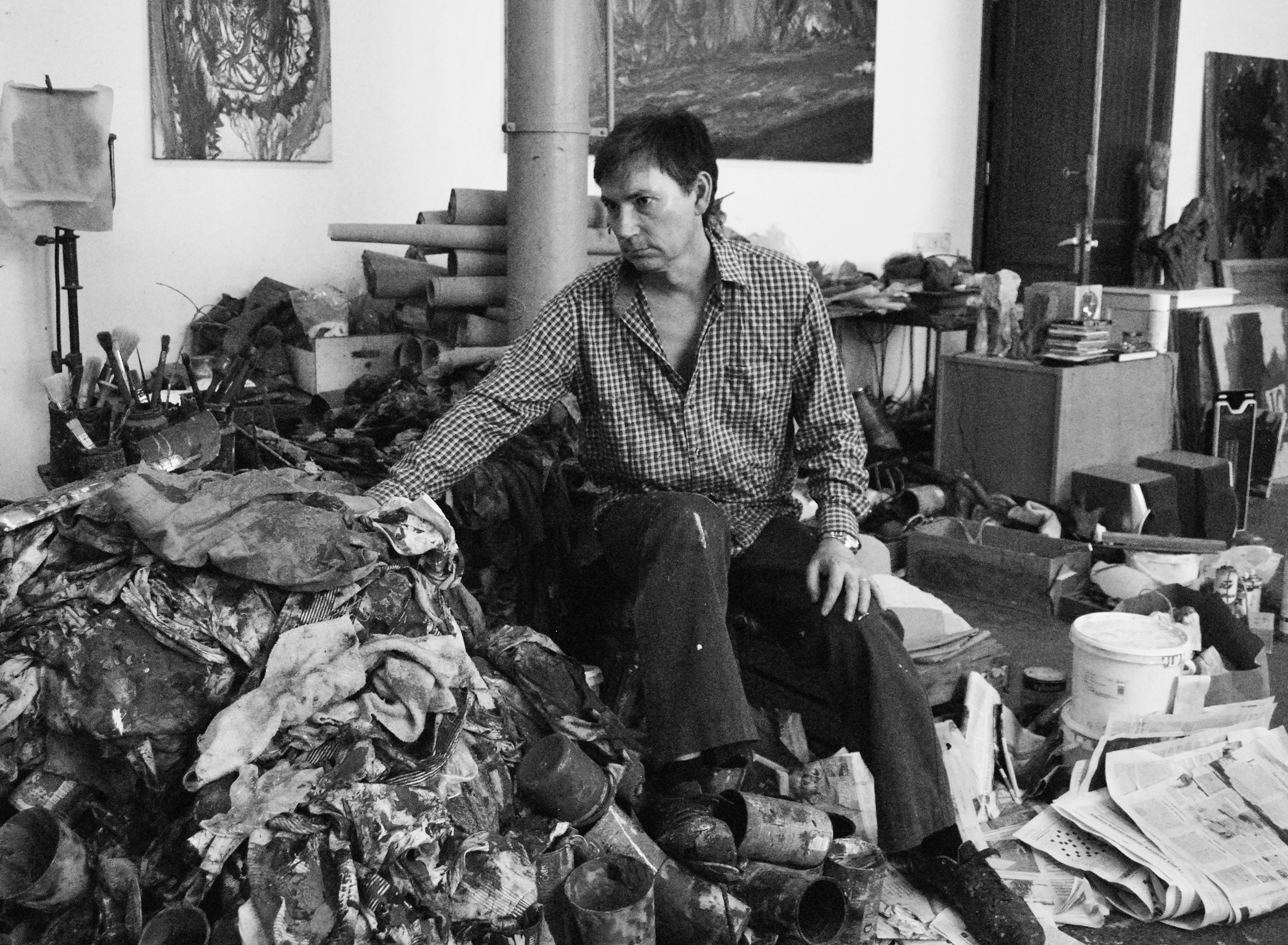
Sàbat in his Sant Sadurní d'Anoia studio, 2017

In 1987, Sàbat established his studio in Sant Sadurní d'Anoia, where he continues to work. His first solo exhibition took place in 1989 at the Capella de l'Antic Hospital in Sant Sadurní d'Anoia. Through the 1990s, he exhibited in Catalonia and Brussels, including Galeria Montcada (1994) and Gallery L n'est pas C (2000).

In 2008, coinciding with the release of his monograph, he told El Periódico: "No m'agrada la falsedat" ("I don't like falseness"), emphasizing authenticity and material sincerity in his art.

The multidisciplinary exhibition at El Palauet (10–13 May 2018) combined painting, sculpture and ceramics. The exhibition catalogue described its motifs as "mythic femininity, erotic mystery, chaos and spiritual transformation". From 2019 to 2023, Sàbat presented solo and group exhibitions in Mexico and Spain, including Jaula de espejos at Centro Cultural La Calera (Oaxaca) and the group show Constructos Abstractos, first held at the Instituto Tecnológico del Valle de Oaxaca and later at Galería Yuri López Kullins in Madrid (15 July–1 August 2023).

In 2024, the Biblioteca de Catalunya organized Una vida dibuixada, a retrospective surveying four decades of Sàbat's painting, engraving, poetry and artist books, affirming his place in contemporary Catalan art.

His work is held in public collections, including the Biblioteca de Catalunya and the Fundació Collserola (Barcelona).

== Publications and film ==
In 2008, Sàbat published the monograph Oriol Sàbat with the Barcelona-based publisher Insòlit. The book includes critical essays by José Corredor-Matheos, Albert Mercadé and Susanna Rafart; It was accompanied by the short film Cursa cap al no-res (2008), produced by Films d’Art, directed by Albert Mercadé, with original text by Sàbat; cinematography, sound and editing by Sebastián Bruno; and an original score by cellist Martin Merker. Reviewing the monograph in Serra d'Or, Àlex Mitrani called it "a serious and stimulating result" produced "with modest means and youthful initiative".

Sàbat's literary works include the prose collection Històries d'un desgavell (2008) and the poetry cycle Els qui moriran et saluden (2024), which José Corredor-Matheos described as "a luminous fusion of image and word … a real book of poems, but also of philosophical thought and personal journal".

== Collaborations ==
Sàbat has collaborated with poets Goya Gutiérrez and Marga Clark, the Argentinian dancer and poet Marta Binetti, and curator Miguel Vives on exhibitions in Oaxaca and Veracruz. These interdisciplinary events frequently merge visual art with live poetry, performance and music.

Since 2020, he has collaborated with the international art collective Associació Internacional Duana de les Arts (AIDA).

== Critical reception ==
Critical commentary on Sàbat's work spans more than three decades and reflects both its symbolic content and material immediacy.

Lourdes Cirlot, writing in the Catálogo nacional de arte contemporáneo (1991–92), described him as "a young artist with extraordinary willpower" whose works "reflect moods and inner states" and merge Romantic and Symbolist influences with expressionist figuration.

Àlex Mitrani, reviewing the 2008 monograph Oriol Sàbat in the cultural journal Serra d'Or, called the book "a serious and stimulating result" produced "with modest means and youthful initiative". Albert Mercadé, in his essay for the same monograph, framed Sàbat's language as "a pictorial combustion between symbol and material", later expanding on this in 2020 as "painting in flames", rooted in elemental forces. He has also published prose and poetry, including Oriol Sàbat (2008).

Conxita Oliver, in the catalogue for the Juan Ramón Masoliver Prize (2001), interpreted Sàbat's brushwork as "a vital diary" marked by immediacy and gestural intensity, linking his abstract forms to lived experience and personal memory.

Natàlia Ramon, writing in Time Out Barcelona (2008), highlighted motifs of "cracked bark, cavities and charred surfaces" as visual metaphors of rebirth and inner transformation. Jaume Vidal Oliveras, in Arte y Parte (2008), situated Sàbat's abstraction within a ritualistic register, describing his canvases as traversing "territories of initiation, sacrifice and purification".

Valentí Gómez i Oliver, in his text for the 2015 exhibition Els Somnis del Xaman, associated Sàbat's practice with shamanic journeys and Mircea Eliade's concept of "invisible worlds", framing the artist as a seeker of spiritual knowledge through material processes. Cirlot later returned to Sàbat's work in 2024, comparing the illustrated narrative L'escletxa d'un somni to William Blake and Edgar Allan Poe for its dream‑like fusion of text and image and its use of an invented personal script. Costa Rican critic Luis Fernando Quirós‑Valverde, commenting on Sàbat's 2023 exhibitions in Oaxaca, described them as "a profound meditation on chaos and uncertainty" rooted in Latin American abstraction.

== Selected exhibitions ==
- 1989 – Capella de l'Antic Hospital, Sant Sadurní d'Anoia (first solo show)
- 1994 – Galeria Montcada, Barcelona
- 2000 – Gallery L n'est pas C, Brussels
- 2008 – Galeria Fidel Balaguer, Barcelona
- 2018 – Exhibition at El Palauet, Barcelona (10–13 May)
- 2019 – Jaula de espejos, Centro Cultural La Calera, Oaxaca de Juárez
- 2019 – Constructos Abstractos, Instituto Tecnológico del Valle de Oaxaca; later at Galería Yuri López Kullins, Madrid (15 July–1 August 2023).
- 2024 – Una vida dibuixada, Biblioteca de Catalunya, Barcelona (retrospective)

For the full chronology, see List of exhibitions by Oriol Sàbat.
