= Sabrael =

Sabrael is an Angel named in the Testament of Solomon and 3 Enoch. According to Masseket Azilut, he was co-chief of the Tarshishim angels.
