= Veaceslav Oriol =

Moldovan cyclist

Personal information
- Born: 29 August 1968 (age 58)

Cycling career
- Sport: Cycling

Veaceslav Oriol (born 29 August 1968) is a Moldovan cyclist. He competed in the men's individual road race at the 1996 Summer Olympics.
