= Oriel House =

Coordinates: 51.888°N 8.601°W

Oriel House, now known as Talbot Hotel Cork, is a 19th-century house at the west end of the town of Ballincollig, County Cork, Ireland. Now operating as a hotel, it was originally built to house administrating officers of the Ballincollig Gunpowder Mills site.

Hosting a number of other businesses after the mills closed, in 1983 it was converted to operate as a hotel by its then owner William (Bill) Shanahan. The hotel was sold in 2003, further developed in 2006, and underwent another change of ownership in 2014.

== History ==
=== Construction ===
Charles Henry Leslie, a Cork banker, built Ballincollig Gunpowder Mills in 1794, though Oriel House itself wasn't built until sometime after this.

Oriel House was built early in the 19th century by the Board of Ordnance following their takeover of the mills site. Originally built as three houses for the administrating officers of the Gunpowder Mills, it was not known as Oriel House until some time later. Mr. Charles Wilkes, who was a superintendent in the Gunpowder Mills, lived in the house in the first decades of the 19th century.

In 1834 the Gunpowder Mills were bought by Thomas Tobin of Liverpool. He married Catherine Ellis in 1835, and they moved into the house. Catherine was a painter, and so the Tobin's built an oriel window to provide additional light for painting. The oriel is about 20 ft long (6.1 m) and 10 ft wide (3.0 m), and has a glass roof to give maximum natural light. It wasn't until after this feature was added that the house became known as Oriel Court.

=== 19th and early 20th centuries ===
In the years after Thomas Tobin's death (1881), the house passed through a series of owners. In Guys Directory of 1886, Colonel W. Balfe of the 11th Hussars was listed as being in Oriel House. The 11th Hussars were in Ballincollig from 1884 to 1886. In 1893, J.McKenzie MacMorran was in the residence and by 1911 Lt. Col. Onslow R.F.A. lived there. In 1916 W. J. O Hara was living there. In 1922 the house was set on fire by republicans, but some local people cut the roof joists and saved the eastern part of the house. Members of the Mac Mullen family are recorded as living in the house in 1925 and 1938. In 1947, Mrs. Marie Louise Perrins (of Lea & Perrins fame) came to live there. She later married Noel Mahony of Blarney Woollen Mills. A keen horsewoman, she later moved out of the house, as she felt the road was getting busy and dangerous for her and her horses (1957).

=== Hotel ===
The house was left to various people until the Shanahan family bought it in 1970. The house was in a state of semi-dereliction at this stage. Oriel House (the name having been changed from Oriel Court) was opened as a hotel in 1983 and was a family-run hotel. The Shanahan family used a number of salvaged items as part of the redecoration and renovation. This included the door to the cellar bar (which came from Cork City Gaol), the doors to the hotel (from the Savoy Cinema in the city) and the counter in the lounge (from a bank in the city).

In 2003, Oriel House was sold (by the Shanahan family) to William and Angela Savage of Cork Luxury Hotels. The new owners undertook additional renovations and reopened the hotel in late 2006.

In 2012, the hotel went into receivership, under the management of BDL Ireland. In 2014 it was purchased by the Talbot Collection, a Hotel Group, who have other properties in Wexford, Carlow, Tipperary, Dublin and at the Talbot Hotel Midleton (previously the Midleton Park Hotel).
