= Plancia gens =

Family in ancient Rome

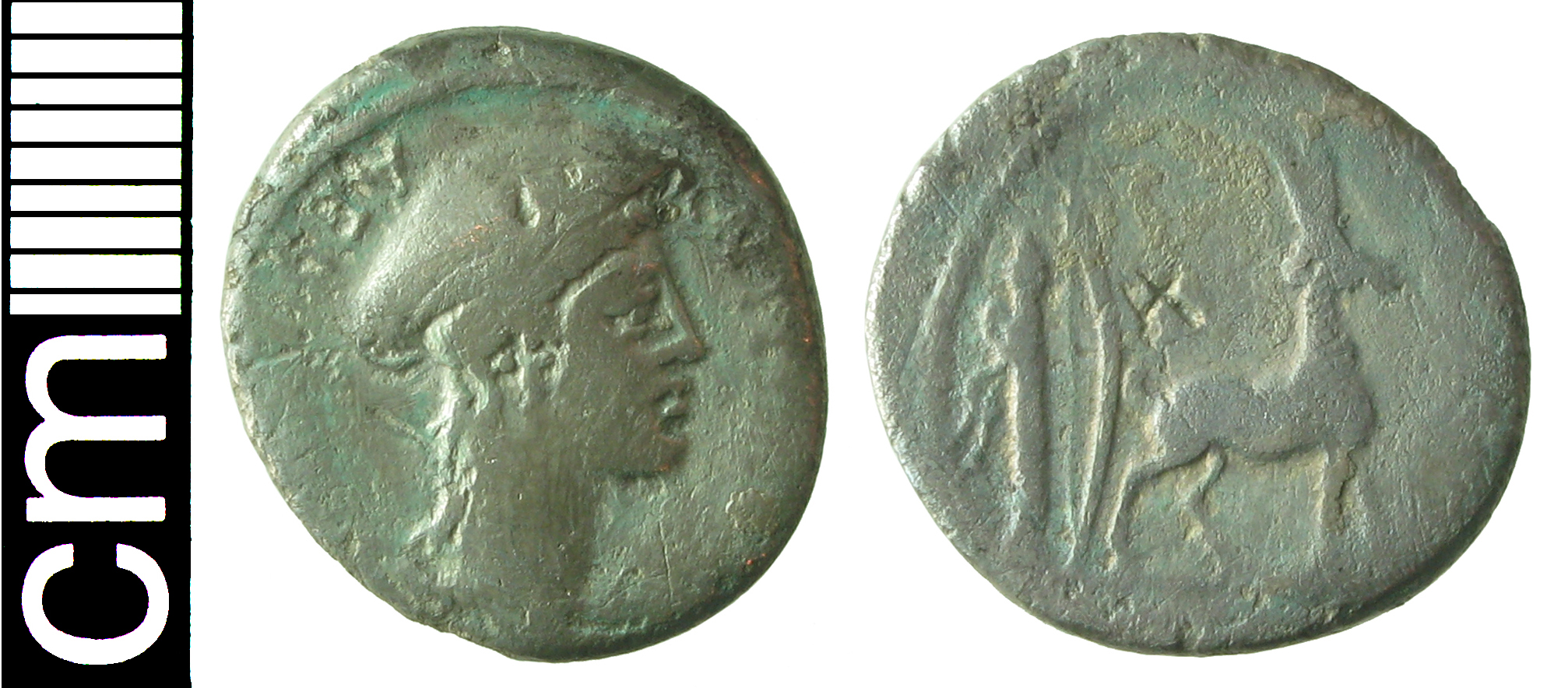
Denarius of Gnaeus Plancius. On the obverse is a woman's head, probably representing the goddess Diana, while the reverse depicts a she-goat with a bow and a quiver of arrows.

The gens Plancia was a minor plebeian family of equestrian rank at ancient Rome. Few members of this gens are mentioned in the time of the Republic, but a family of the Plancii rose to prominence from the time of Vespasian, and held a number of important magistracies through the time of Hadrian. Other Plancii are known from inscriptions.

== Origin ==
The nomen Plancius is derived from the common Latin surname Plancus, originally referring to a person with flat feet. The Plancii must therefore have been Latins. Chase classifies them among those families that either originated at Rome, or cannot be shown to have originated anywhere else. However, the Plancii known to Cicero hailed from Atina, a town in southern Latium that had been taken during the Samnite Wars.

== Members ==
This list includes abbreviated praenomina. For an explanation of this practice, see filiation.

- Gnaeus Plancius, an eques who served under Publius Licinius Crassus, consul in 97 BC. Plancius became a publican, and was influential in his field, pressing for a law reducing the amount that the publicani had to pay for the taxes in Asia. He was an early supporter of Caesar, who reduced the fee in 59 BC, to the great annoyance of the aristocracy.
- Gnaeus Plancius Cn. f., quaestor in Macedonia in 58 BC, and tribune of the plebs in 56. Elected aedile in 54, he was accused of sodalitium, a form of electoral bribery, but was successfully defended by Cicero. He supported Pompeius during the Civil War, and afterward lived in exile at Corcyra.
- Marcus Plancius Varus, governor of Bithynia and Pontus, and subsequently of Achaia and Asia. He had previously served as one of the decemviri stlitibus judicandis, quaestor, and tribune of the plebs, according to an inscription dating to the reign of Vespasian.
- Plancia M. f. Magna, the wife of Gaius Julius Cornutus Tertullus, and high priestess of Artemis at Perga.
- Gaius Julius P. f. Plancius Varus Cornutus Tertullus, consul suffectus for September and October of AD 100, together with Pliny the Younger. He was governor of several provinces at various times, including Crete and Cyrenaica, Gallia Narbonensis, Bithynia and Pontus, and finally Asia.
- Gaius Julius C. f. P. n. Plancius Varus Cornutus Tertullus, son of the governor Tertullus.
- Gaius Plancius M. f. Varus, consul in an uncertain year during the reign of Hadrian.
- Gaius Plancius, named in an inscription from Troesmis in Moesia Inferior, dating to AD 163.
- Titus Plancius T. f., a soldier named in an inscription from Rome, dating to AD 183.
- Plancia T. (f.?), buried at Atina, together with Titus Plancius.
- Titus Plancius, buried at Atina, together with Plancia.
- Lucius Plancius Anta, buried at Aquileia in Venetia and Histria.
- Marcus Plancius Augustalis, buried at Rome, aged eight years, seven months, and ten days.
- Marcus Plancius Prunicus, a freedman buried at Rome.
- Gnaeus Plancius Cn. l. Turpio, a freedman named in a funerary inscription from Rome.
- Marcus Plancius Valens, buried at Germa in Galatia, with a monument from his son, Marcus.
- Marcus Plancius M. f. Va[...], build a monument at Germa for his father, Marcus Plancius Valens. He might be the same person as the governor Marcus Plancius Varus.
- Lucius Plancius L. f. Victorianus, a priest at Thibica in Africa Proconsularis.

== See also ==
- List of Roman gentes

== Bibliography ==
- Marcus Tullius Cicero, Epistulae ad Atticum, Epistulae ad Familiares, Epistulae ad Quintum Fratrem, Pro Plancio.
- Joseph Hilarius Eckhel, Doctrina Numorum Veterum (The Study of Ancient Coins, 1792–1798).
- Dictionary of Greek and Roman Biography and Mythology, William Smith, ed., Little, Brown and Company, Boston (1849).
- Theodor Mommsen et alii, Corpus Inscriptionum Latinarum (The Body of Latin Inscriptions, abbreviated CIL), Berlin-Brandenburgische Akademie der Wissenschaften (1853–present).
- René Cagnat et alii, L'Année épigraphique (The Year in Epigraphy, abbreviated AE), Presses Universitaires de France (1888–present).
- George Davis Chase, "The Origin of Roman Praenomina", in Harvard Studies in Classical Philology, vol. VIII (1897).
- T. Robert S. Broughton, The Magistrates of the Roman Republic, American Philological Association (1952).
- Anna Sadurska, Inscriptions Latines & Monuments Funéraires Romains au Musée National de Varsovie (Latin Inscriptions and Roman Monuments from the National Museum of Warsaw, abbreviated ILVarsovie), Warsaw (1953).
- Giovanni Battista Brusin, Inscriptiones Aquileiae (Inscriptions of Aquileia, abbreviated InscrAqu), Udine (1991–1993).
- Inschriften Griechischer Städte aus Kleinasien (Inscriptions from the Greek Cities of Asia Minor, abbreviated IK): 54. Die Inschriften von Perge 1, Bonn (1999).
