= Julia (daughter of Tigranes VI of Armenia) =

Daughter of 1st century Herodian King Tigranes VI of Armenia

Julia was a Herodian Princess who lived in the 1st century and possibly in the 2nd century in the Roman Empire.

She was of Jewish, Nabataean, Edomite, Greek, Armenian and Persian ancestry. Julia was the daughter of the Herodian Prince, later King, Tigranes VI of Armenia and his wife Opgalli. In the spring of 58 her father was crowned as King of Armenia by Roman Emperor Nero in Rome and ruled there until 63. Julia had a brother called Gaius Julius Alexander, who was the Roman Client King of the Kingdom of Cetis, a small region in Cilicia.

Her paternal grandparents were the Judean Prince Alexander and his wife, whose name is unknown. Through her father, Julia was the great granddaughter of Cappadocian Princess Glaphyra and Judean Prince Alexander. Julia was the great, great granddaughter of King Archelaus of Cappadocia, King of Judea Herod the Great and his wife Mariamne. Julia along with her brother and father were last the known descendants of the Kings of Cappadocia.

Little is known on Julia's life. At an unknown date Julia married a Roman Senator called Marcus Plancius Varus. Varus was a prominent and wealthy Roman, who owned large estates in Galatia. Varus served as a Proconsul in Bithynia and later in Pontus during the reign of Roman Emperor Vespasian who ruled in the Roman Empire 69–79.

After Varus concluded his term as a Proconsul, he and Julia settled in Perga, the capital of the Roman province of Pamphylia. Julia became a priestess and served in the temple of the Ancient Greek Goddess Artemis in Perga. Artemis was the most important Goddess in Perga.

Julia bore Varus two children who were:

- Son, Gaius Plancius Varus, who became a Roman Senator and served as a consul during the reign of Roman Emperor Hadrian, who reigned 117–138. Gaius like his father became a prominent patron and prominent citizen in Perga.
- Daughter, Plancia Magna. Plancia Magna married a man of Roman Senatorial rank from Perga, a local citizen called Gaius Julius Cornutus Tertullus. Cornutus Tertullus and Plancia Magna had a son called Gaius Julius Plancius Varus Cornutus, who was Julia and her husband's only grandchild. Plancia Magna, like her father and brother, became a prominent patron and citizen in Perga.

== Sources ==
- https://web.archive.org/web/20050104093812/http://www.iznik.bel.tr/bld-gov/eng/eistkapi.htm
- https://web.archive.org/web/20080509195203/http://www.serifyenen.com/heritage_Summer2005.asp
- acsearch.info ancient coin search engine: Kings of Armenia
- Grainger, John D. (2003). Nerva and the Roman succession Crisis AD 96-99. London, New York: Routledge. pp. xvi. ISBN 0-415-28917-3. OCLC 52012210.
- Schwartz, Seth (1990). Josephus and Judaean politics. Columbia studies in the classical tradition. Leiden, New York: Brill. p. 137. ISBN 90-04-09230-7. OCLC 21595783.
