= Gaius Julius Cornutus Bryonianus =

Gaius Julius Cornutus Bryonianus was a Roman who lived in the 1st century in the Roman Empire. Bryonianus originally came from Perga, the capital of the Roman province of Pamphylia. Bryonianus could have been related to a certain Bryonianus Lollianus, a local man of Equestrian Rank from Side, Pamphylia.

Bryonianus served as an Agonothetes (magistrate of games) during the Varian Games in Perga. He had built a large, prestigious palace where he lived. The palace was built near the baths in Perga and its remains are still there.

Bryonianus in the reign of Roman Emperor Claudius (41-54), had built Perga's Palaestra. The monument measures 76 x 76 meters and Bryonianus dedicated this building and its inscription to Claudius. The Palaestra's structure has been preserved well. In the reign of Roman Emperor Nero (54-68) Bryonianus did a bilingual (see Multilingualism) dedication to Nero.

Bryonianus could have married a Roman woman called Tertulla. From this marriage, he had a son called Gaius Julius Cornutus Tertullus a future proconsul, suffect consul and a friend to historian Pliny the Younger.

== Sources ==
- Grainger, John D. (2003). Nerva and the Roman succession Crisis AD 96-99. London, New York: Routledge. pp. xvi. ISBN 0-415-28917-3. OCLC 52012210.
- Shelagh Jameson, "Cornutus Tertullus and the Plancii of Perge", Journal of Roman Studies, 55 (1965), pp. 54–58
