= Julia Tertulla =

Daughter of Cornutus Tertullus

Julia Tertulla was a Roman woman who lived in the 1st century and 2nd century in the Roman Empire. Tertulla was the daughter of suffect consul Gaius Julius Cornutus Tertullus and the identity of her mother is unknown. Tertulla was born and raised in Perga, the capital of the Roman province of Pamphylia. She was the paternal aunt to Gaius Julius Plancius Varus Cornutus.

She married Lucius Julius Marinus Caecilius Simplex, a Roman Senator. He was Proconsul of Lycia et Pamphylia from 96-98 and served as a consul in 101 during the reign of the Roman Emperor Trajan in Rome. In the city of Tlos, Lycia there is an honorary inscription dedicated to her as the wife of Caecilius Simplex. This dedication was most probably done when her husband served as a legatus Augusti in that province.

== Sources ==
- Shelagh Jameson, "Cornutus Tertullus and the Plancii of Perge", Journal of Roman Studies, 55 (1965), pp. 54–58
- Jones, Brian W. (1992). The Emperor Domitian, Routledge
- Grainger, John D. (2003). Nerva and the Roman succession Crisis AD 96-99. London, New York: Routledge. pp. xvi. ISBN 0-415-28917-3. OCLC 52012210.
