= Varus =

Varus may refer to:

- Var River or Varus, a river in France
- Stura di Lanzo or Varus, a river in Italy
- Varus deformity, a medical term for the inward angulation of the distal segment of a bone or joint
  - Coxa vara, affecting the hip
  - Genu varum, affecting the knee
  - Hallux varus, affecting the big toe
  - Cubitus varus, affecting the elbow
  - Club foot (talipes equinovarus), affecting the heel

== People with the name ==
- Publius Attius Varus (died 45 BC), Roman governor of Africa
- Publius Quinctilius Varus (46 BC – AD 9), politician and general of the Roman Empire
- Publius Quinctilius Varus the Younger (c. AD 1 – 27), son of Publius Quinctilius Varus
- Marcus Plancius Varus (1st century AD), politician of the Roman Empire
- Gaius Plancius Varus (1st–2nd century AD), son of Marcus Plancius Varus and politician of the Roman Empire
- Titus Clodius Vibius Varus, Roman consul, 160 AD
- Titus Vibius Varus, Roman consul, 134 AD
- Titus Vibius Varus, Roman suffect consul, 115 AD
- Alfenus Varus, 1st-century Roman jurist and possible consul
- Saint Varus (died c. AD 307), early Christian martyr, soldier from Egypt
- Varus of Laodicea (Ancient Greek: Οὔαρος), a Greek sophist

== Other Uses ==
- Varus (supermarket), Ukrainian supermarket chain
