= Cornutus =

Cornutus (Ancient Greek: Κορνοῦτος) may refer to:

== Ancient Rome ==
- Servius Sulpicius Camerinus Cornutus, consul in 500 BC
- Quintus Sulpicius Camerinus Cornutus (consul), consul in 490 BC
- Servius Sulpicius Camerinus Cornutus (consul 461 BC)
- Quintus Sulpicius Camerinus Cornutus (consular tribune), consular tribune in 402 and 398 BC
- Marcus Caecilius Cornutus, urban praetor in 43 BC
- Lucius Annaeus Cornutus (fl. c. 60 AD), a Stoic philosopher under emperor Nero
- Gaius Julius Cornutus Tertullus, suffect consul in 100 AD and a friend of Pliny the Younger
- Quintus Fuficius Cornutus, suffect consul in 147 AD
- Gaius Julius Plancius Varus Cornutus, the last descendant of Herod the Great

== Biology ==
- Species of numerous genera, including:
  - Dipterocarpus cornutus, a species of tree
  - Turbo cornutus, a species of sea snail
- Cornutus (plural: cornuti), a part of the aedeagus of the male lepidoptera genitalia (butterflies and moths)

== See also ==
- List of Roman cognomina
