= Orokenda =

Town in ancient Pamphylia

Coordinates: 36°51′37″N 31°35′41″E

Orokenda was a town in ancient Pamphylia, inhabited during Roman times. Its name does not occur in ancient authors, but is inferred by epigraphic and other evidence.

Its site is located east of Sennea, in Asiatic Turkey.
