= November 9 (Eastern Orthodox liturgics) =

Day in the Eastern Orthodox liturgical calendar

Eastern Orthodox liturgical calendar
November 8	November 9	November 10
November 9 O.S. ≍ November 22 N.S. November 9 N.S ≍ October 27 O.S.

An Eastern Orthodox cross

November 9 in Eastern Orthodox liturgical calendars is a feast day and a day of commemoration of saints and martyrs. Although some Orthodox churches use the Revised Julian Calendar and others use the traditional Julian calendar, the fixed commemorations for their respective November 9 are broadly the same, no matter which calendar is used. (Note: Despite the dates being the same, the days to which they refer typically differ by 13 days. The notation Old Style or O.S. is sometimes used to indicate a date in the traditional Julian Calendar (the "Old Calendar"). The notation New Style or N.S. indicates a date in the Revised Julian calendar (the "New Calendar").)

== Saints ==
- Martyrs Onesiphorus and Porphyrius of Ephesus (284–305)
- Venerable Matrona of Perge, Abbess of Constantinople (492)
- Martyr Alexander of Thessalonica (c. 305) (Note: "At Thessalonica, St. Alexander, martyr, during the reign of Maximian.")
- Martyrs Narses and Artemon, by the sword. (see also: December 9 )
- Martyrs Christopher and Maura, by the sword.
- The Four Crowned Martyrs:

- Claudius, Castor, Sempronian, and Nicostratus, of Pannonia (c. 306) (see also: November 8 - West)

- Venerable Helladius, monk.
- Venerable John the Short of Egypt (John Kolobos, John the Dwarf) (c. 407)
- Martyr Anthony of Apamea (5th century)
- Venerables Eustolia (610) and Sosipatra (625), of Constantinople. (Note: "At Constantinople, the holy virgins Eustolia, a native of Rome, and Sopatra, daughter of the emperor Maurice.")
- Venerable Theoctiste of Lesbos, of the Monastery Panagia "Ekatontapyliani" (Hundred Doors) in Paros (881)
- Venerable Symeon Metaphrastes ('the Translator') of Constantinople (960)
- Venerable Saints Euthymius (990) and Neophytus (c. 1118), founders of Docheiariou, Mount Athos.

== Pre-Schism Western saints ==
- Saint Agrippinus of Naples (Arpinus), Bishop of Naples (2nd or 3rd century) (Note: Bishop of Naples in Italy, where he has been greatly venerated from time immemorial. His relics are enshrined under the altar of the Cathedral of Naples with Sts Eutychius and Acutius, companions of St Januarius.) (Note: "At Naples, in Campania, St. Agrippinus, a bishop renowned for miracles.")
- Saint Ursinus of Bourges, first Bishop of Bourges in France (3rd century) (Note: "At Bourges, St. Ursinus, confessor, who was ordained at Rome by the successors of the apostles and appointed first bishop of that city.")
- Saint Benignus of Armagh (Benen), Bishop of Armagh (468) (Note: 'Benen, son of Sessenen, St Patrick's Psalmsinger'. A favourite disciple of St Patrick, whom he succeeded as the main bishop in Ireland. He preached mainly in Clare and Kerry and founded a monastery in Drumlease.)
- Saint Pabo, founder of the monastery later called Llanbabo, in Anglesey, Wales (c. 510)
- Saint Vitonus (Vanne, Vaune), Bishop of Verdun (c. 525) (Note: A monastery in Lorraine was later dedicated to him.)

== Post-Schism Orthodox saints ==
- Venerable Onesiphorus the Confessor, of the Kiev Caves (1148)
- Saint Nektarios (Kephalas) of Aegina, Metropolitan of Pentapolis and Wonderworker of Aegina (1920) (Note: Name days celebrated today include: Nectarios (Νεκτάριος); Nectaria (Νεκταρία).) (Note: The translation of his relics took place on September 3, 1953 and on April 20, 1961, when he was canonized by the Ecumenical Patriarchate of Constantinople.)

=== New martyrs and confessors ===
- New Hieromartyr Parthenius (Bryansky), Bishop of Ananyevsk (1937) (Note: See: (in Russian) Парфений (Брянских). Википедии. (Russian Wikipedia).)
- New Hieromartyr Alexis (Zadvornov), Hieromonk of the Afanasiev Convent, Yaroslavl (1937)
- New Hieromartyrs Constantine Cherepanov, Demetrius Rusinov, Nestor Panin, Theodore Chichkanov, Constantine Nemeshaev, Victor Klimov, Elias Rylko and Paul Ansimov, (Note: See: (in Russian) Ансимов, Павел Георгиевич. Википедии. (Russian Wikipedia).) Priests (1937)
- New Hieromartyr Joseph Schensnovich, Deacon (1937)

== Other commemorations ==
- Icon of the Most Holy Theotokos "She Who Is Quick to Hear" (Gorgoepēkoos) of Docheiariou, Mount Athos (10th century) (Note: In 1938, the Dochiariou monastery presented a copy of the wonderworking Icon of the Mother of God "Quick to Hear" to the Russian Spiritual Mission at Jerusalem.) (Note: See: (in Russian) Икона Божией Матери Скоропослушница. Википедии. (Russian Wikipedia).)
- Repose of Righteous Eldress Matrona of Penza (1937) (Note: (in Russian) Спасо-Преображенский монастырь в Пензе.)

== Icon gallery ==
Martyrs Onesiphorus and Porphyrius of Ephesus.
(Dionysiou Monastery, Mt. Athos).

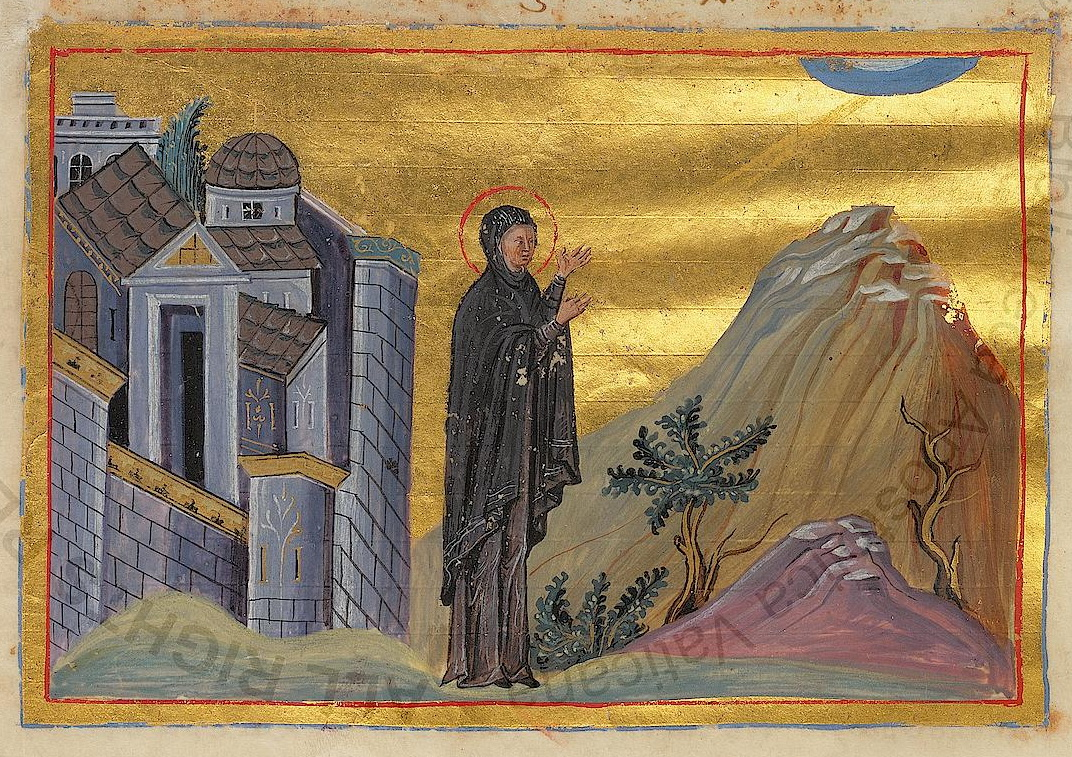
Venerable Matrona of Perge, Abbess of Constantinople.
(Menologion of Basil II, 10th century).

Martyr Alexander of Thessalonica.
(Menologion of Basil II, 10th century).

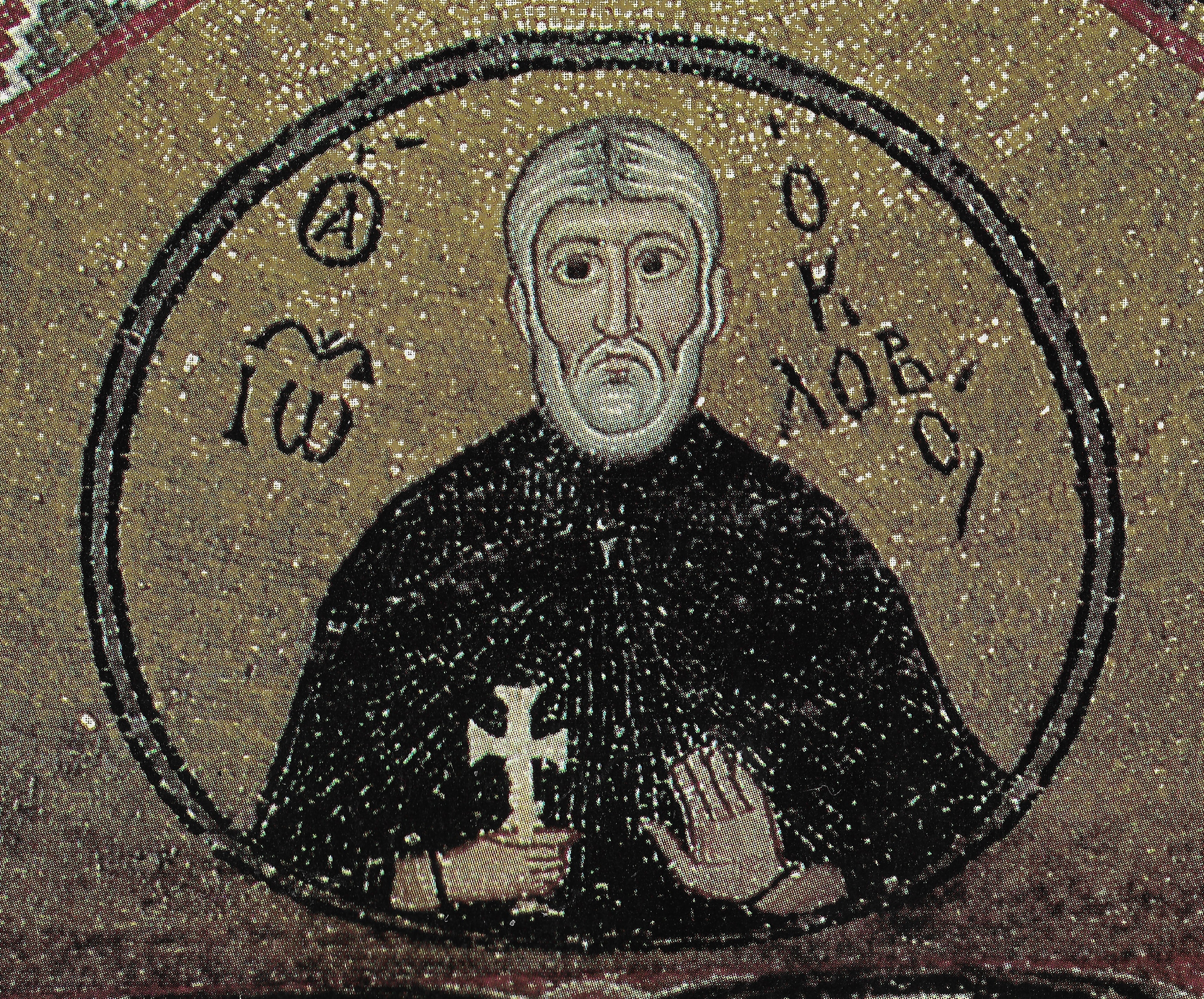
St. John the Short of Egypt
(John Kolobos).

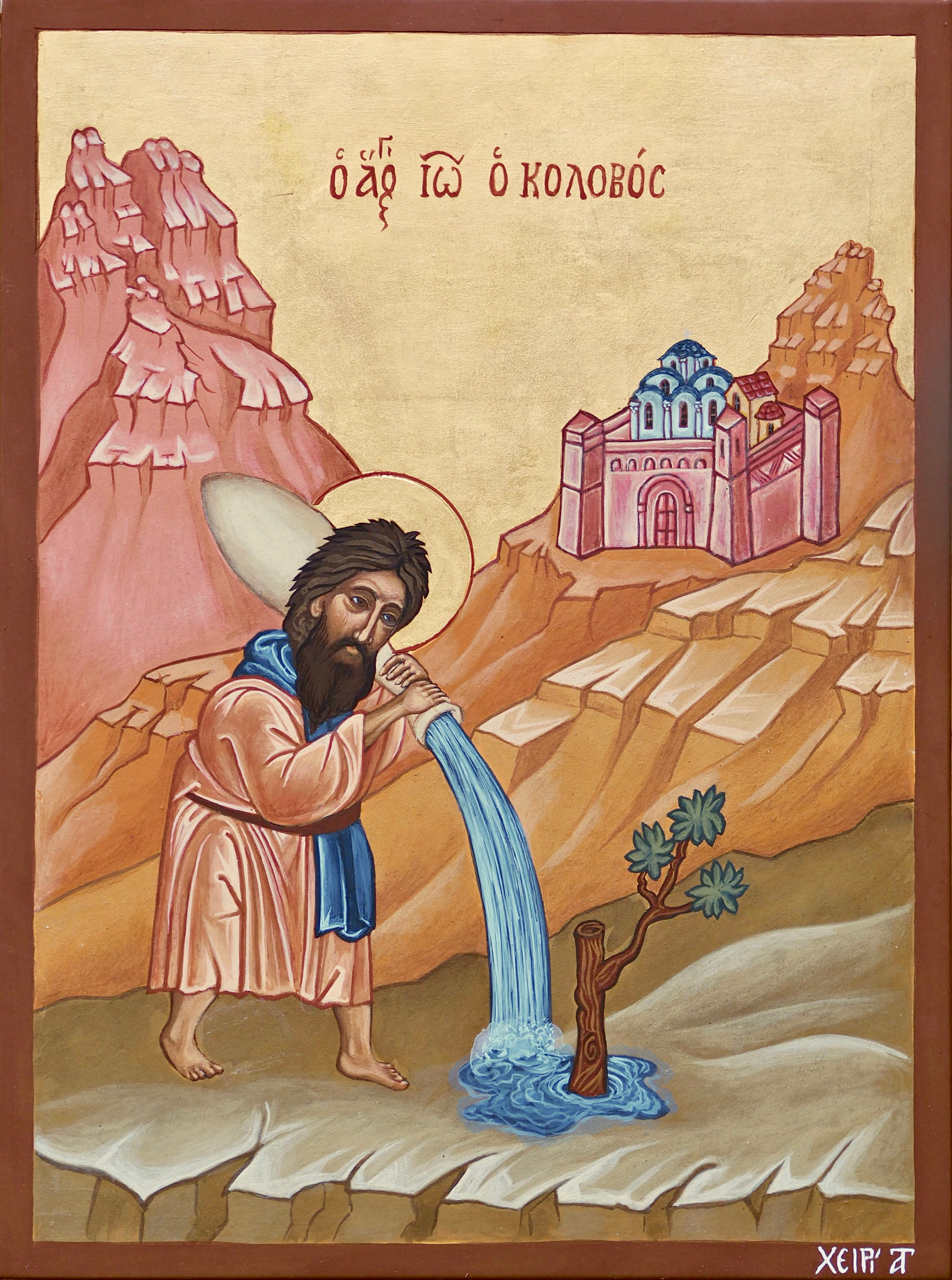
St. John the Short of Egypt
(John Kolobos).

Martyr Anthony of Apamea.
(Menologion of Basil II, 10th century).

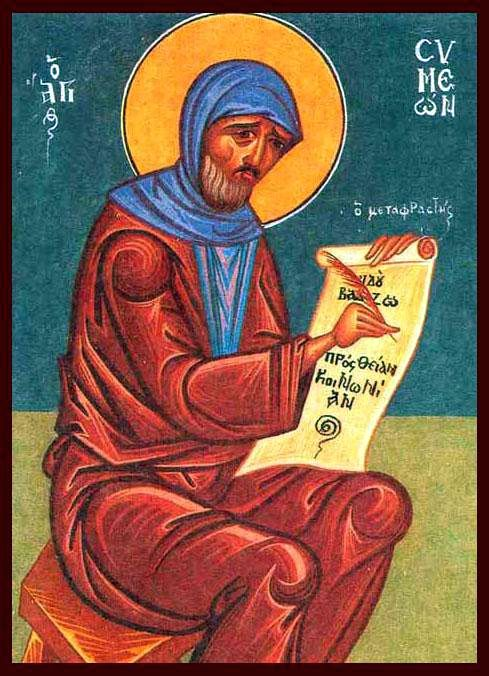
Venerable Symeon Metaphrastes ('the Translator') of Constantinople.

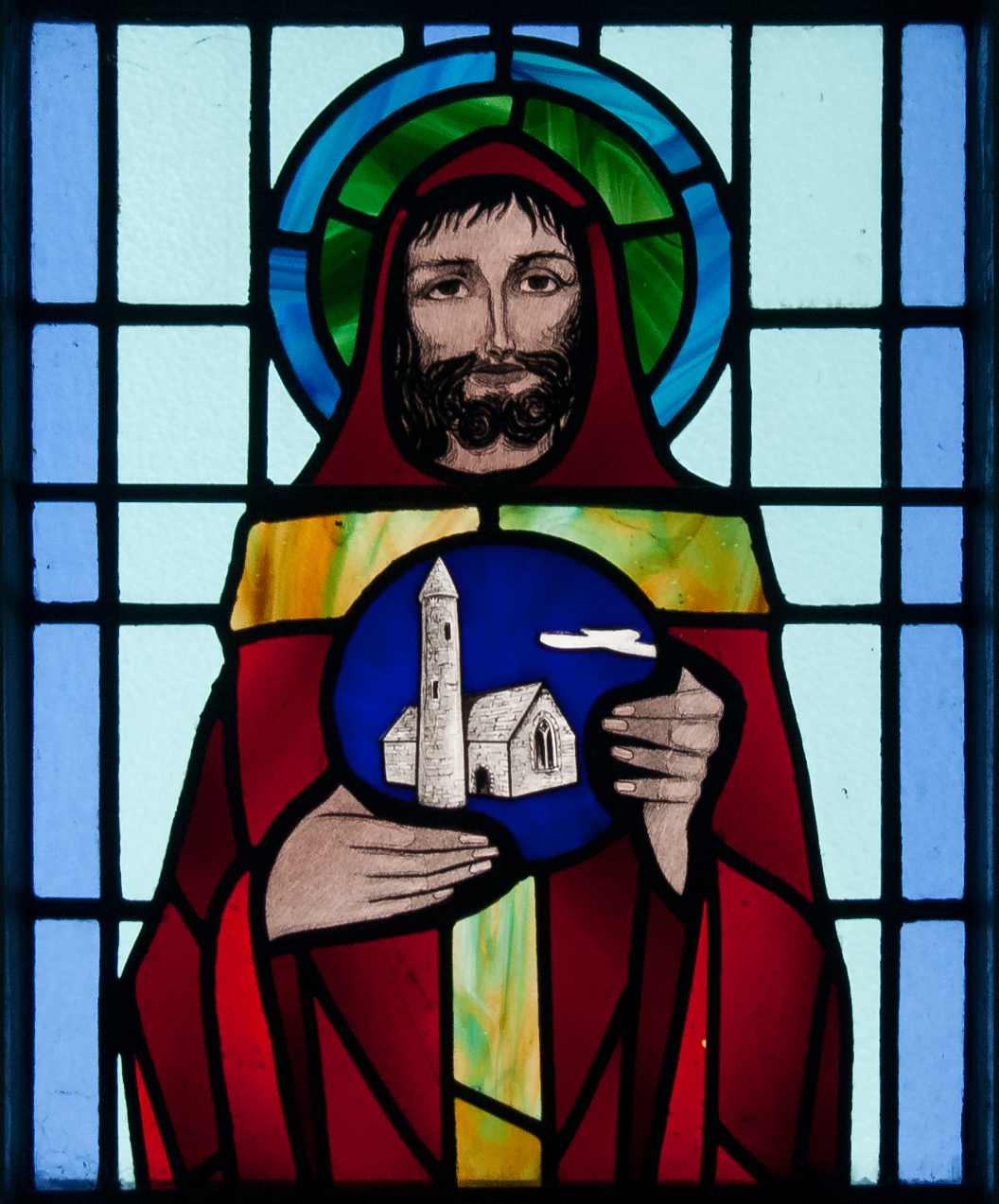
St. Benignus of Armagh, St. Patrick's Psalm singer.

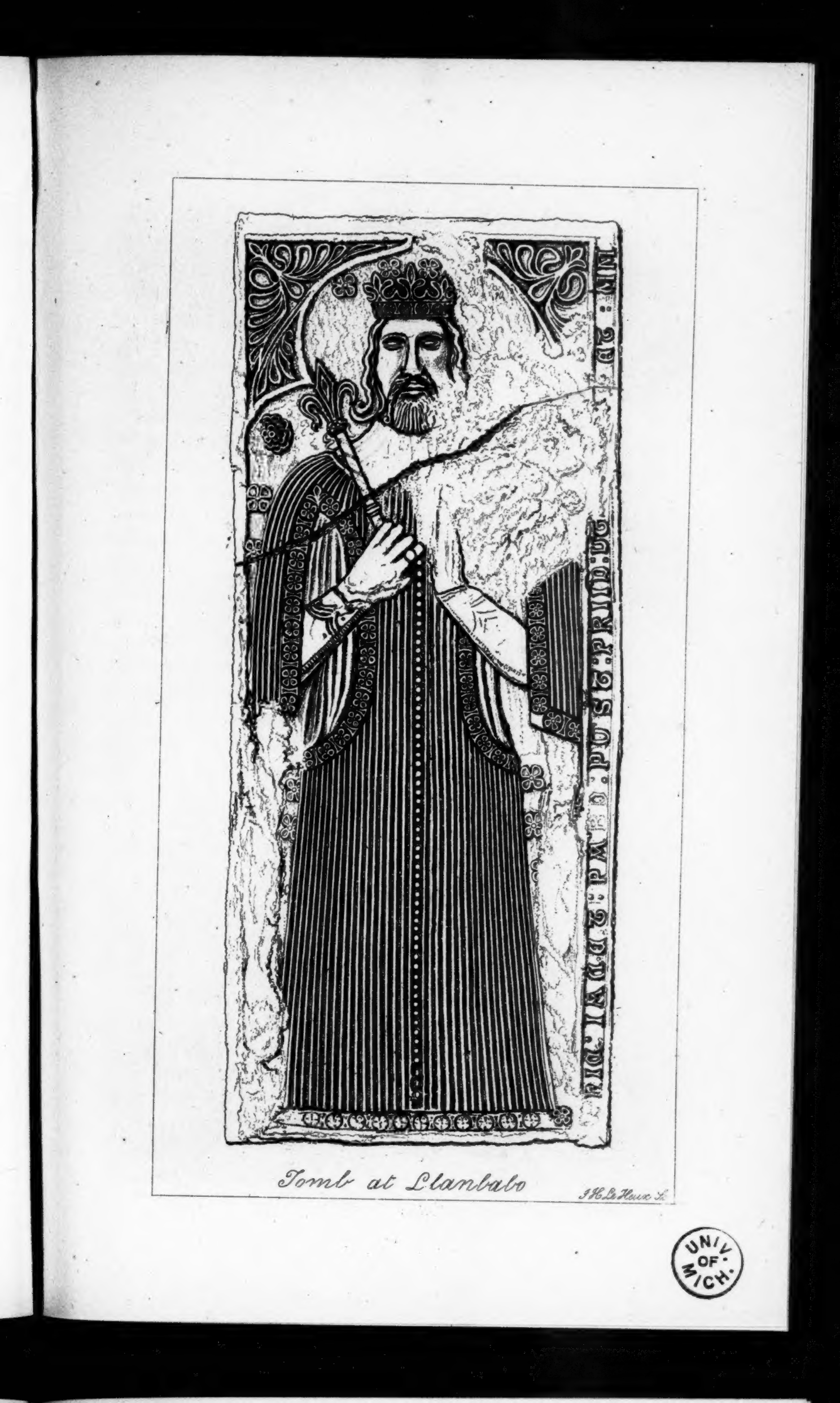
Saint Pabo Post Prydain.

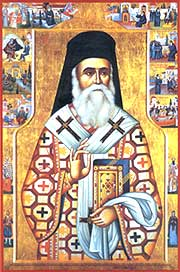
St. Nektarios of Aegina.

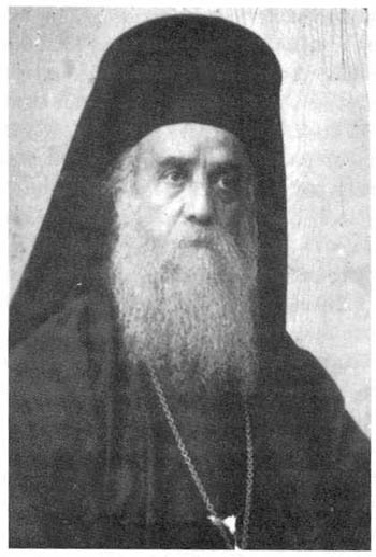
St. Nektarios of Aegina.

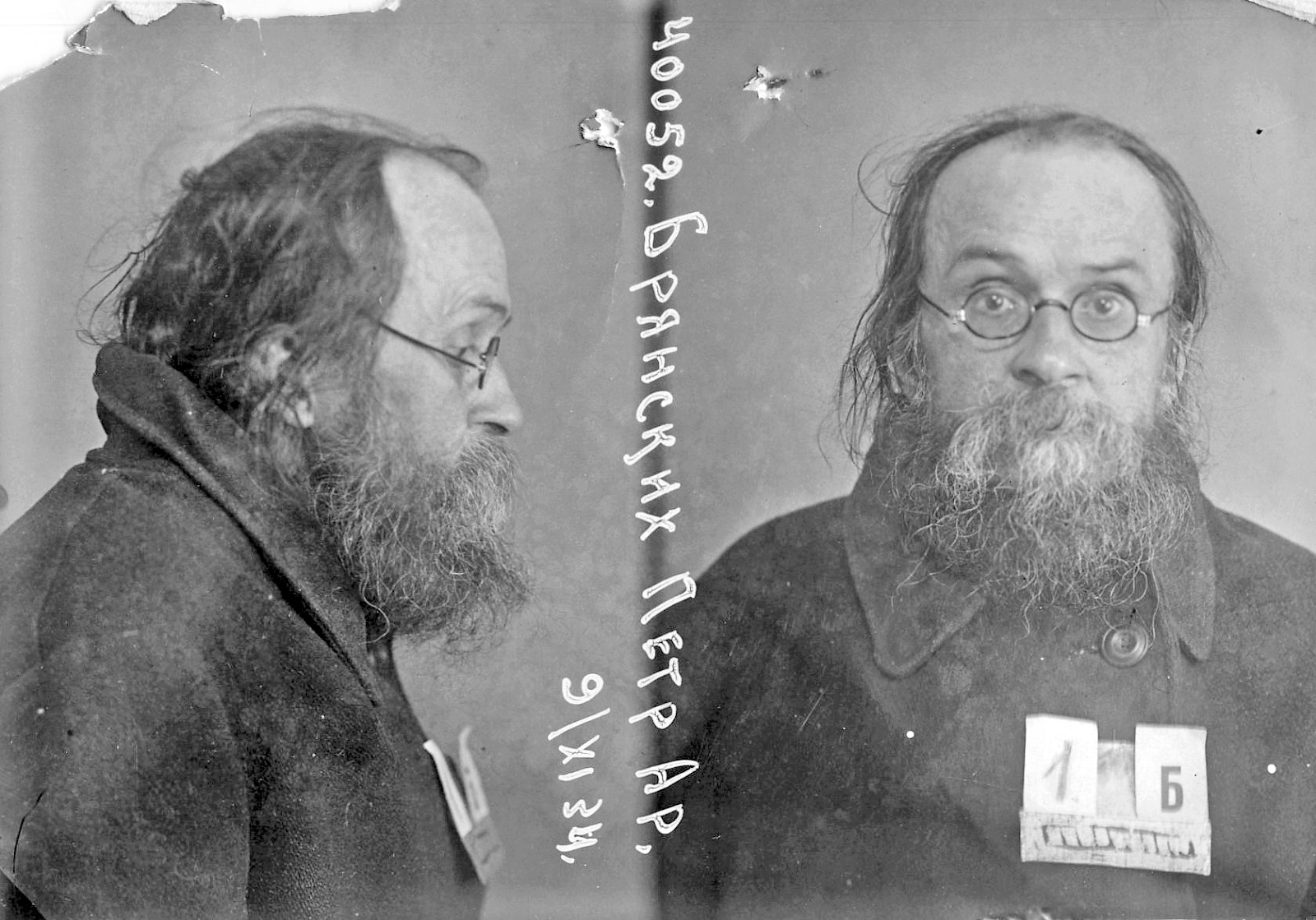
New Hieromartyr Parthenius (Bryansky), Bishop of Ananyevsk.

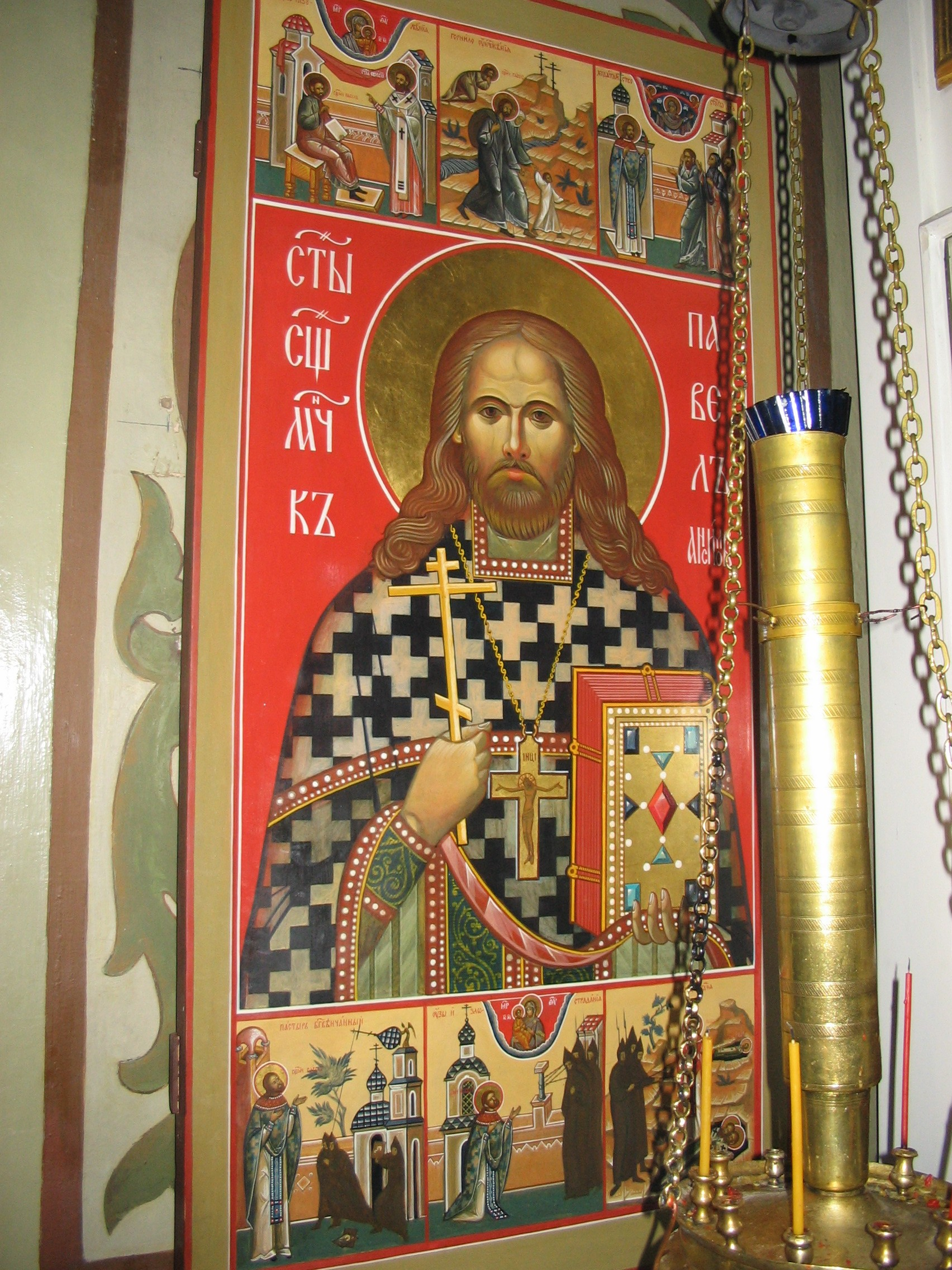
New Hieromartyr Paul Ansimov, Priest.

Icon of the Most Holy Theotokos "She Who Is Quick to Hear"
(Docheiariou Monastery, Mt. Athos).

== Sources ==
- November 9/November 22. Orthodox Calendar (PRAVOSLAVIE.RU).
- November 22 / November 9. HOLY TRINITY RUSSIAN ORTHODOX CHURCH (A parish of the Patriarchate of Moscow).
- November 9. OCA - The Lives of the Saints.
- The Autonomous Orthodox Metropolia of Western Europe and the Americas (ROCOR). St. Hilarion Calendar of Saints for the year of our Lord 2004. St. Hilarion Press (Austin, TX). p. 84.
- The Ninth Day of the Month of November. Orthodoxy in China.
- November 9. Latin Saints of the Orthodox Patriarchate of Rome.
- The Roman Martyrology. Transl. by the Archbishop of Baltimore. Last Edition, According to the Copy Printed at Rome in 1914. Revised Edition, with the Imprimatur of His Eminence Cardinal Gibbons. Baltimore: John Murphy Company, 1916. pp. 345–346.
- Rev. Richard Stanton. A Menology of England and Wales, or, Brief Memorials of the Ancient British and English Saints Arranged According to the Calendar, Together with the Martyrs of the 16th and 17th Centuries. London: Burns & Oates, 1892. pp. 531–532.

Greek Sources

- Great Synaxaristes: (in Greek) 9 ΝΟΕΜΒΡΙΟΥ. ΜΕΓΑΣ ΣΥΝΑΞΑΡΙΣΤΗΣ.
- (in Greek) Συναξαριστής. 9 Νοεμβρίου. ECCLESIA.GR. (H ΕΚΚΛΗΣΙΑ ΤΗΣ ΕΛΛΑΔΟΣ).
- (in Greek) November 9. Ορθόδοξος Συναξαριστής.

Russian Sources

- (in Russian) 22 ноября (9 ноября). Православная Энциклопедия под редакцией Патриарха Московского и всея Руси Кирилла (электронная версия). (Orthodox Encyclopedia - Pravenc.ru).
- (in Russian) 9 ноября по старому стилю / 22 ноября по новому стилю. Русская Православная Церковь - Православный церковный календарь на 2016 год.
