= Aurelia Paulina =

Roman priestess during the Severan dynasty

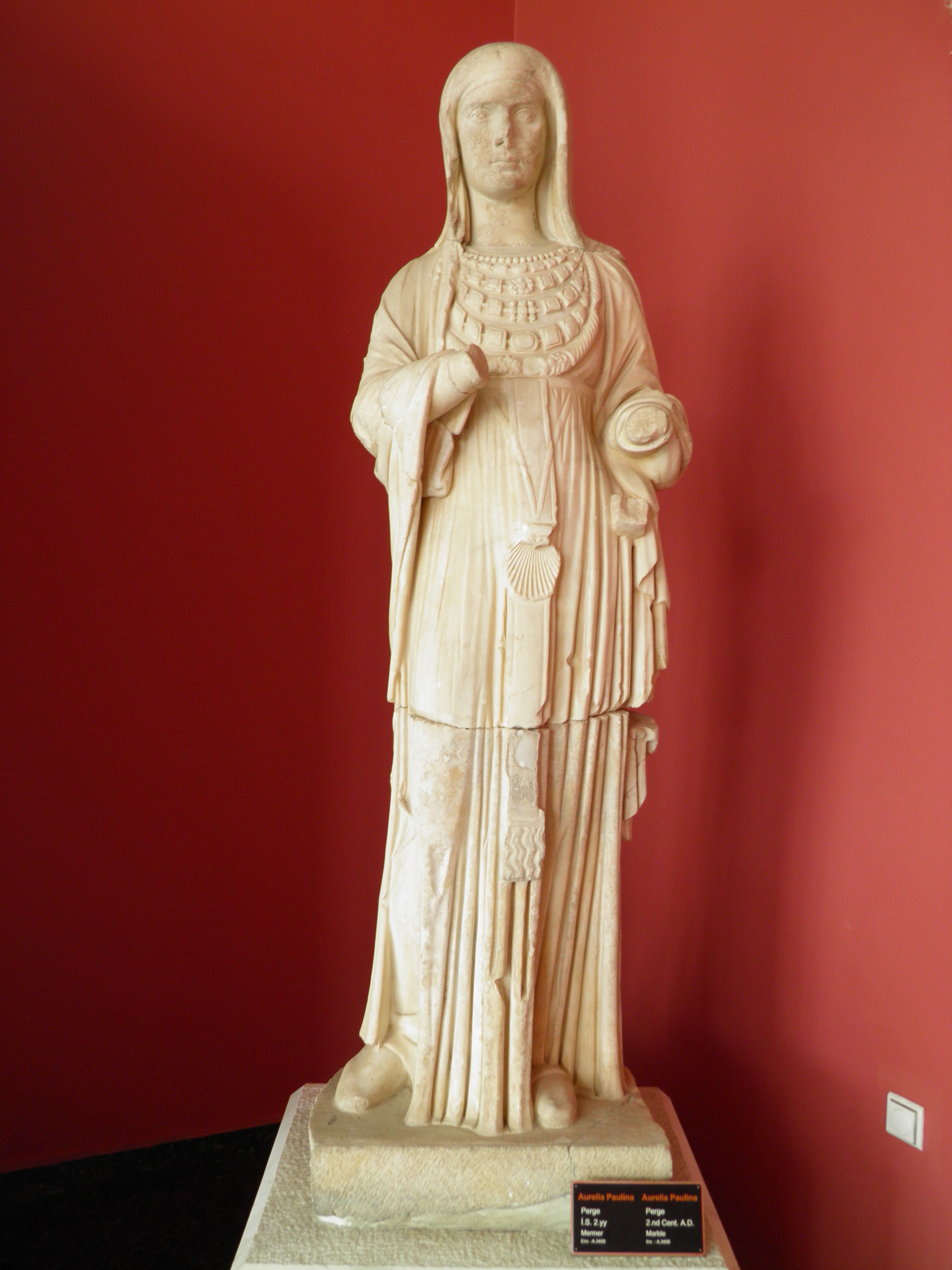
- Statue of Aurelia Paulina
- Citizenship: Roman Empire
- Era: 2nd-3rd centuries CE

Aurelia Paulina was a local prominent noblewoman in Anatolia who lived in the late 2nd century, early 3rd century in the Roman Empire. She was a contemporary to the rule of Roman Emperor Commodus (reigned 180–192) and the Severan dynasty.

Paulina originated from a wealthy family, although not of Senatorial rank from the province of Syria. She emigrated to Perga the capital of the Roman province of Pamphylia in Anatolia. Paulina married an Anatolian noble called Aquilus from Sillyon. Sometime after, Paulina and Aquilus received Roman citizenship from Commodus, thus receiving and adding the name Aurelius to their names.

According to surviving inscriptions, it is understood that Paulina held the offices of priestess of the Goddess Artemis in Perga. Artemis was the most important Goddess in Perga. Aquilus with Paulina shared the title of as priest and priestess of the imperial cult in Perga. Like Plancia Magna before her, Paulina donated to Perga a trapezoidal courtyard outside the southern city gate, constructing a large monumental nymphaeum, which is now in ruins. Archaeologists have suggested that the monumental fountain had been built on the location of an ancient spring.

Two inscriptions explain that Paulina dedicated the nymphaeum to Artemis and to the reigning Roman Emperor Lucius Septimius Severus (reigned 193–211); his wife Roman Empress Julia Domna; and their sons: Lucius Septimius Bassianus (Caracalla) and Publius Septimius Geta.

An extant portrait statue survives of Paulina. She is shown in Syrian dress: wearing heavy jewelry covering her chest and her long chain ending in a large shell pendant. The extant dress of Paulina in this statue is a typical female portrait of Syrian women from this period. Some scholars suggest that Paulina wants to emphasize her links with Julia Domna, who was also Syrian.

Over the large arch of the nymphaeum, there is a pediment with a relief of a distinctively feminine symbolism depicting the deities Eros, Artemis, and Dionysus. Between the three deities depicts a priestess with a large shell pendant, perhaps resembling Paulina.

== Sources ==
- Plancia Magna, Aurelia Paulina, and Regilla: Civic Donors, Vroma.org, Barbara F. McManus
