= Kalelibelen =

Town in ancient Pamphylia

Coordinates: 36°46′19″N 31°35′41″E

Kalelibelen was a town in ancient Pamphylia.

Its site is located near Belenobası, in Asiatic Turkey.
