= Pisarissos =

Town of ancient Pamphylia or of Cilicia

Coordinates: 36°39′39″N 31°43′41″E

Pisarissos was a town of ancient Pamphylia or of Cilicia, inhabited during Roman times. Its name does not occur in ancient authors, but is inferred by epigraphic and other evidence.

Its site is located near Cavurbeleni, in Asiatic Turkey.
