= Lucius Arruntius Stella =

Late 1st/early 2nd century Roman senator and consul

Lucius Arruntius Stella was a Roman senator, who was active during the reigns of Domitian, Nerva and Trajan. He was suffect consul in October of 101 as the colleague of Lucius Julius Marinus Caecilius Simplex. He is known from the works of the poets Martial and Statius. Martial records Stella wrote poems, in a style influenced by Catullus and Tibullus. None of his poems have survived.

According to Martial, Stella had come from Patavium in northern Italy. He was appointed to organize the games that celebrated Domitian's victory over the Chatti and Dacians in either the year 89 or 93. Stella had also become a member of the Quindecimviri sacris faciundis, the Roman priesthood entrusted with the care of the Sibylline oracles, which admitted him by AD 91.

Statius wrote an epithalamium, or a marriage poem, for Stella. It is from this work we learn the identity of his wife: Violentilla, a wealthy Neapolitan widow.

Political offices
Preceded by [...]us Proculus, and ignotus as Suffect consuls	Suffect consul of the Roman Empire; 101 with Lucius Julius Marinus Caecilius Simplex	Succeeded by Lucius Julius Ursus Servianus, and Lucius Licinius Sura II as Ordinary consuls
