= Gaius Plancius Varus =

Roman consul under Emperor Hadrian

Gaius Plancius Varus was a Roman who lived between the 1st century and 2nd century in the Roman Empire. Varus was the son of the Roman Senator and Proconsul Marcus Plancius Varus, and the Herodian Princess Julia. His sister was Plancia Magna; he was therefore the maternal uncle to Gaius Julius Plancius Varus Cornutus. Varus was born and raised in Perga, the capital of the Roman province of Pamphylia.

His maternal grandparents were King Tigranes VI of Armenia and his wife Opgalli, while his maternal uncle was prince Gaius Julius Alexander. Varus was of Roman, Jewish, Nabataean, Edomite, Greek, Armenian and Persian ancestry. Varus’ maternal ancestors were King Archelaus of Cappadocia, King of Judea Herod the Great, and his wife Mariamne. Varus along with his maternal cousins were among the last known descendants of the Herodian Dynasty. He appeared to be an apostate to Judaism. It is unlikely that Varus attempted to exert influence on Judean politics.

Varus served as a Roman Senator and became a consul at an unknown date during the reign of the Roman Emperor Hadrian who ruled the Roman Empire from 117 to 138. It is unknown whether Varus had married or had any children.

In Perga, the city's most magnificent structure was the Hellenistic Gate that was the entrance to the city. Inside in the courtyard of the Hellenistic Gate, there are inscribed bases of statues that bear the names of Varus and his father. From these inscriptions it is understood that Varus with his father were wealthy, influential and generous citizens in Perga. Varus and his father were made benefactors who contributed to the prosperity of Perga. Due to the goodness and generosity of Varus and his father, they were both accepted as the second founders of the city. They were both honored with the title ‘’Ktistes’’ or ’’Founder’‘.

== Bibliography ==
- Schwartz, Seth (1990). Josephus and Judaean politics. Columbia studies in the classical tradition. Leiden, New York: Brill. p. 137. ISBN 90-04-09230-7. OCLC 21595783.
- Grainger, John D. (2003). Nerva and the Roman succession Crisis AD 96-99. London, New York: Routledge. pp. xvi. ISBN 0-415-28917-3. OCLC 52012210.
