= Sennea =

Town in Roman times

Coordinates: 36°52′26″N 31°32′04″E

Sennea was a town in ancient Pamphylia, inhabited during Roman times. Its name does not occur in ancient authors, but is inferred by epigraphic and other evidence.

Its site is tentatively located near Gölçük Ören, in Asiatic Turkey.
