= Lucius Julius Marinus Caecilius Simplex =

Late 1st/early 2nd century Roman senator and consul

Lucius Julius Marinus Caecilius Simplex was a Roman senator who held several posts in the emperor's service. Simplex was then appointed suffect consul in late 101, with Lucius Arruntius Stella as his colleague. His career is primarily known through inscriptions.

His polyonymous name indicates that Simplex was either adopted, or incorporated his mother's name; the consensus is that he incorporated his mother's name into his. His father has been identified as Lucius Julius Marinus, attested as governor of Lower Moesia in January 97, and whose tenure as suffect consul has been dated around AD 93. His mother is considered a daughter of Gnaeus Caecilius Simplex, one of the suffect consuls of 69.

== Life ==
His career is documented by an inscription recovered from Cures, although there are three more fragmentary inscriptions that record different portions of his career. Simplex began his career in the vigintiviri, as a member of the quattuorviri viarum curandarum, then served as military tribune in Legio IV Scythica, then stationed in Moesia. As a quaestor, he was one of those allocated by lot to one of the ten public provinces administered by a proconsul; in his case, Simplex was assigned to Macedonia. He held the next offices expected in the cursus honorum without incident, plebeian aedile and then praetor.

The proconsular portion of his career began with service as a legate, first to the proconsul of Cyprus (88/89), and afterwards to the proconsul of Bithynia et Pontus; in the latter province, it is thought the proconsul he assisted was his father, Julius Marinus. Simplex was then appointed by emperor Domitian to be legatus legionis or commander of Legio XI Claudia Pia Fidelis, which was stationed facing the Danube in Vindonissa. Simplex afterwards governed two provinces, one as legate of the emperor Trajan, Lycia et Pamphylia (96-99), the other as a proconsul, Achaea (99-100). His life after his consulate is not known.

Simplex is known to have married Julia Tertulla, the sister or daughter of Gaius Julius Cornutus Tertullus, the friend of Pliny the Younger.

Political offices
| Preceded by [...]us Proculus, and ignotus as Suffect consuls | Suffect consul of the Roman Empire; 101 with Lucius Arruntius Stella | Succeeded by Lucius Julius Ursus Servianus, and Lucius Licinius Sura II as Ordinary consuls |
