= Gaius Julius Plancius Varus Cornutus =

2nd century Roman senator

Gaius Julius Plancius Varus Cornutus was a man of Roman Senatorial rank who lived in the Roman Empire in the 2nd century.

Cornutus was the son of Gaius Julius Cornutus Tertullus and Plancia Magna. His paternal grandparents were the Proconsul and Suffect Consul Gaius Julius Cornutus Tertullus and possibly Tertulla. While his maternal grandparents were the Roman Senator and Proconsul Marcus Plancius Varus and Herodian Princess Julia. His family were prominent citizens and patrons in Perga.

Cornutus was of Roman, Jewish, Nabataean, Edomite, Greek, Armenian and Persian ancestry. Through his maternal grandmother, Cornutus' ancestors were King Archelaus of Cappadocia, King of Judea Herod the Great and his wife Mariamne. Cornutus along with his mother, maternal uncle Gaius Plancius Varus and his maternal relatives were among the last known descendants of the Herodian Dynasty. He appeared to be an apostate to Judaism. It is unlikely that Cornutus attempted to exert influence on Judean Politics. He was born and raised in Perga, the capital of the Roman province of Pamphylia.

In the Agora in Perga, the local government in Perga had dedicated and honored Cornutus with an inscription on a statue base. This inscription honors Cornutus and his family. Cornutus and his ancestors are highly praised as the benefactors of Perga and the inscription states how lawful, considerable and rewarding citizens they were. This inscriptions reveals how prominent he and his family were and shows the respect that the citizens of Perga had for Cornutus and his family.

== Sources ==
- Jameson, Shelagh (1965). "Cornutus Tertullus and the Plancii of Perge". The Journal of Roman Studies. 55 (1/2, Parts 1 and 2): 54–58. doi:10.2307/297430. JSTOR 297430.
- Schwartz, Seth (1990). Josephus and Judaean politics. Columbia studies in the classical tradition. Leiden, New York: Brill. p. 137. ISBN 978-90-04-09230-3. OCLC 21595783.
- Grainger, John D. (2003). Nerva and the Roman succession Crisis AD 96-99. London, New York: Routledge. pp. xvi. ISBN 978-0-415-28917-7. OCLC 52012210.
