= Plancia Magna =

Ancient Roman woman

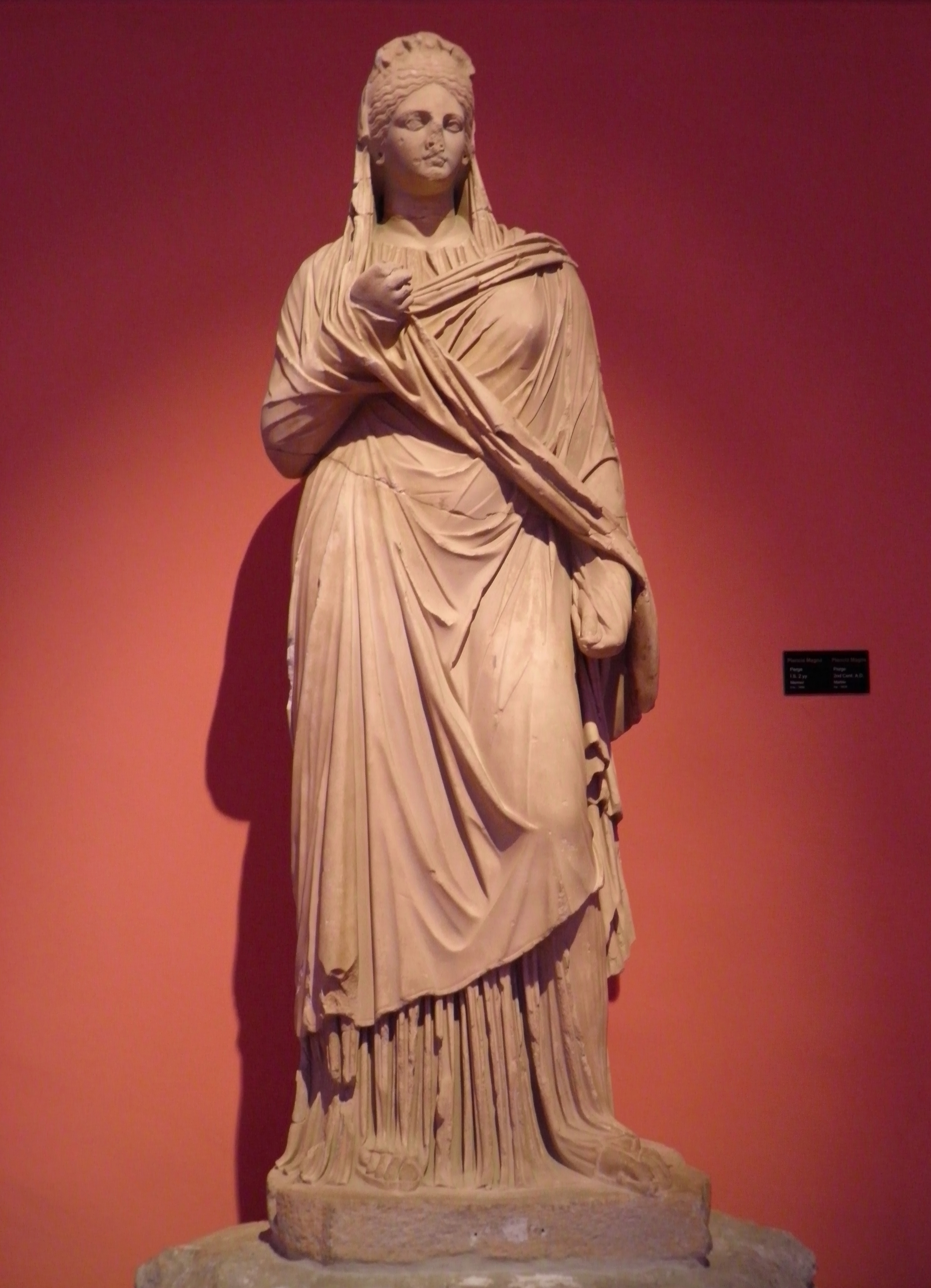
Statue of Plancia Magna from Perga

Plancia Magna (Greek: Πλανκία Μαγνά) was a prominent woman of Perga in the Roman province of Lycia et Pamphylia who lived in the 1st and 2nd centuries. During her life she was not only a high priestess, but a decurion and preeminent benefactress to the city, funding the restoration of the main city gates between the years AD 119 and 122.

== Ancestry, family, and early life ==
Plancia Magna was the daughter of the Roman Senator Marcus Plancius Varus and the Herodian Princess Julia, daughter of king Tigranes VI of Armenia. The Plancii were among the wealthiest and most notable families of Roman Asia Minor around this time, having arrived in Perga as traders from Latium at the end of the Roman Republic. Both Magna's father and her brother, Gaius Plancius Varus, were given the honorary title ktistes ("founder"), reflecting their local prominence and patronage of the city.

Magna married the Roman Senator Gaius Julius Cornutus Tertullus, suffect consul in 100 with his friend Pliny the Younger. Magna bore Tertullus a son, Gaius Julius Plancius Varus Cornutus.

== Activity in Perga ==
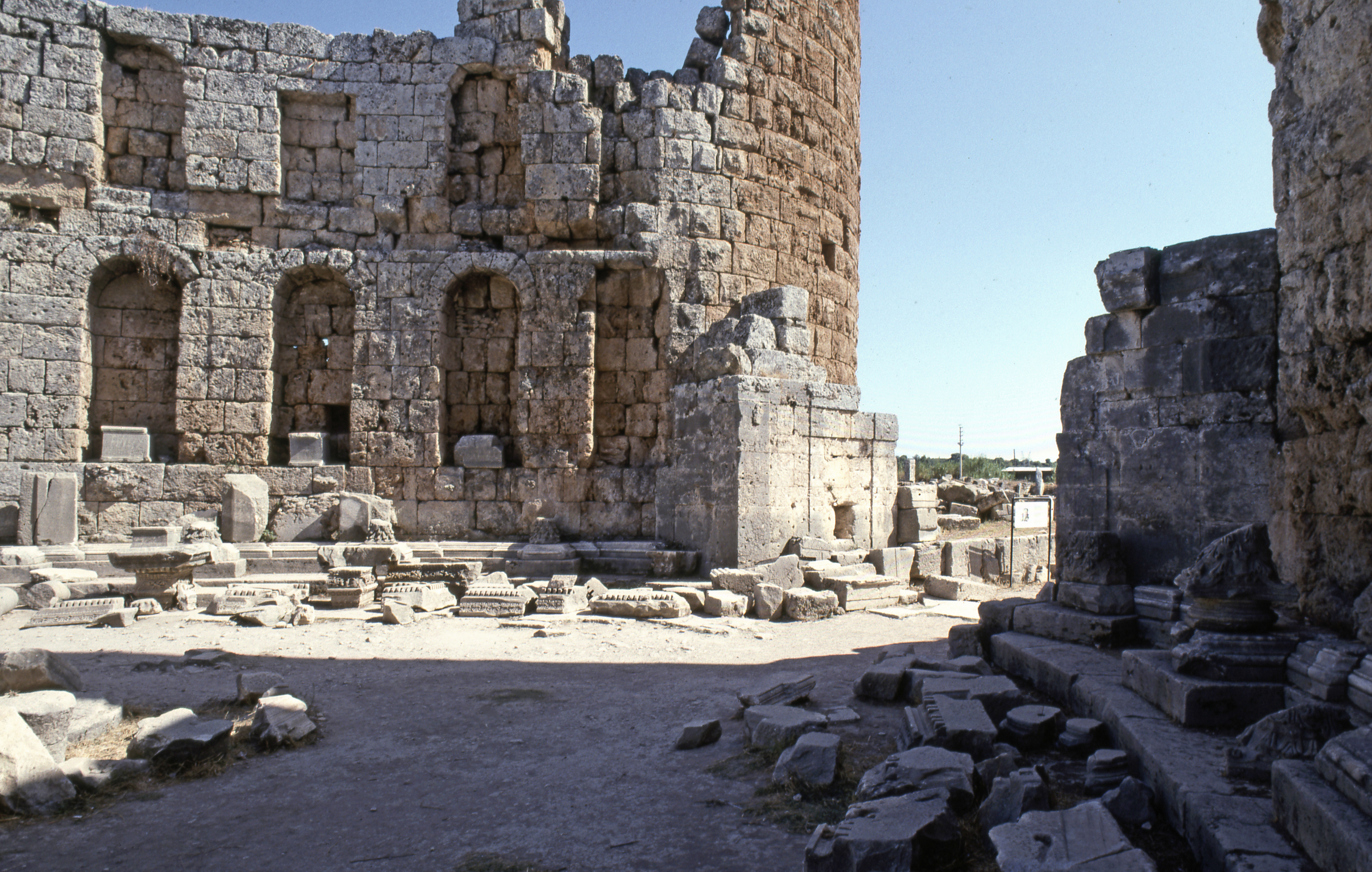
Ruins of the south gate

In the reign of Emperor Hadrian, Plancia Magna funded major civic improvements in Perga. These improvements included the restoration and expansion of the Hellenistic southern gate at Perga, a magnificent structure protecting the coast-facing entrance to the city, originally built in the 3rd century BC. The round towers flanking the gate were refurbished, and just past the gate was constructed a horseshoe-shaped courtyard adorned with two tiers of statues, twenty-eight in total. On the lower tier were large statues of various Greek deities, while the upper tier held smaller depictions of historical and mythological figures linked to Perga, including Magna's own father and brother. Adjacent niches, their contents now lost, may have contained statues of Magna's husband or son, also prominent local figures. Uniquely, the inscriptions define Magna's family members in relation to her ("father/brother of Plancia Magna"), establishing a dominance which is unseen in other contemporary female-commissioned statuary.

The exit from the courtyard into the city was through a monumental triple passage arch, which housed further statues of Artemis (Perga's chief deity) and the deified imperial family. The assemblage included more imperial women than men. The inscription for Salonia Matidia (died 119) uses the posthumous title diva, while that of Pompeia Plotina (died 122) does not—thus, the erection of the statues can be approximately dated to within the intervening years. Each statue's inscription included an attribution, identifying them as the product of Magna's beneficence:

Translated from Latin [first two lines]:

to the genius of the city
Plancia Magna daughter of Marcus

Translated from Greek [last two lines]:

to the fortune of the city
Plancia Magna

In addition to her donations, Magna was personally active in the civil and religious society of Perga. She served multiple terms as city magistrate, and held a wealth of titles: priestess of Artemis, high-priestess of the imperial cult, "priestess for life of the mother of the gods", and demiourgos. The last was the highest civil position attainable in the city, and the officeholder's name was used to identify the year in all official documents. Magna is the only known female demiourgos of Perga.

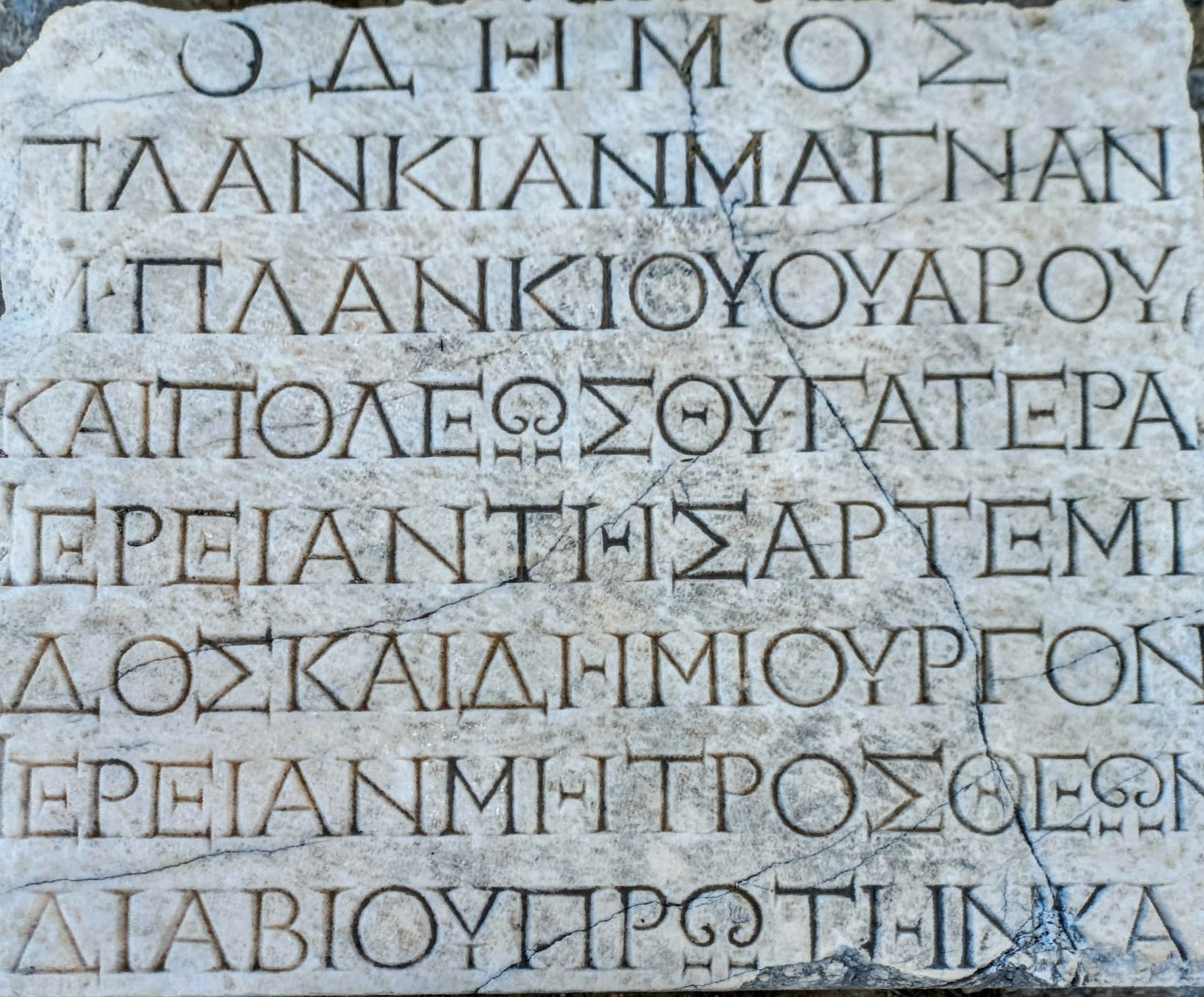
The statue base in Perge.

A surviving inscription from the base of a statue erected by the community of Perga reveals her position in the city:

Plancia Magna
Daughter of Marcus Plancius Varus
and daughter of the city.
Priestess of Artemis
and both first and sole public priestess
of the mother of the gods
for the duration of her life
pious and patriotic.
