= Matrona of Perge =

Byzantine saint

Saint Matrona of Perge
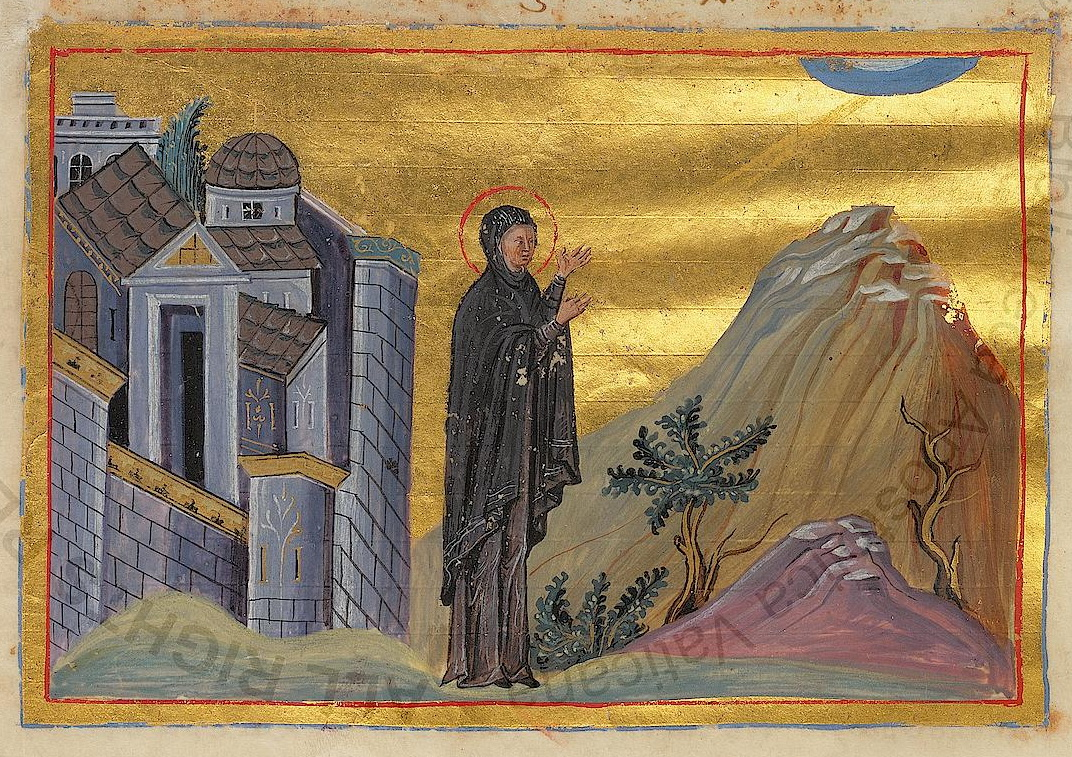
- An illustration from the Menologion of Basil II
- Born: c. 425; Perge, Asia Minor
- Died: c. 525
- Venerated in: Eastern Orthodox Church
- Feast: November 9

Matrona of Perge (Greek: Ματρώνα) was a Byzantine female saint known for temporarily cross-dressing and taking the name Babylas (or Babylos in some translations) to escape her husband after she decided to become a monk and live following 1 Corinthians 7:29 "those who have wives should live as if they do not".

== Life ==
Matrona was born in Perge about 424. She was married to Domitianus and they had one daughter, named Theodote. Pious and charitable, she persuaded Domitianus to move to Constantinople, where she would visit the churches. When she attended night vigils, her jealous and suspicious husband accused her of being a prostitute. Wishing to lead an ascetic life, she abandoned her home and stayed with an acquaintance, Susanna, to whom she entrusted her daughter.

Afraid her husband would find her, she cut her hair, dressed in men's clothes, and presented herself at the monastery of St. Bassianus as a eunuch named Babylas. The monks received her and she became a member of the community, and was set to work in the garden. After about three years, Bassianus realized the ruse and Matrona returned temporarily to Susanna. But as her husband continued to search for her Bassianus suggested that she go to a woman's monastery in Emesa, where she eventually became abbess. She became famous for her miraculous gift of healing. Her husband subsequently found her and followed her to Jerusalem, Syria, and Beirut, where she lived as an ascetic in an ancient pagan temple.

When Bassianus learned of this he decided to establish a small monastery for Matrona and others not far from his own. The nuns under the leadership of Matrona were granted a unique privilege by Bassianus, "He did not give her woolen girdles and veils such as women were accustomed to wear, but men's wide black leather belts and men's white mantles. And these they wore continuously".

According to her vita, St. Matrona died at the age of 100, putting her death around the year 524, according to Hippolyte Delehaye.

Her Life is known to us through two primary versions: the vita prima, whose author and date are still debated, and the Metaphrastic version by Symeon Metaphrastes.
