= Gaius Julius Cornutus Tertullus =

Gaius Julius Cornutus Tertullus was a Roman senator who was active during the late 1st and early 2nd centuries. He is best known as the older friend of Pliny the Younger, with whom Cornutus was suffect consul for the nundinium of September to October 100.

== Family ==
How Cornutus is related to other known Romans of his time is unclear. Older authorities note that the one inscription that preserves his full name is missing the middle of the relevant line, and conclude from the name of his son, Gaius Julius Plancius Varus Cornutus, that Cornutus' full name may be Gaius Julius Plancius Varus Cornutus Tertullus. This would imply that he is somehow related to Marcus Plancius Varus, a citizen of Perga, who was proconsular governor of Bithynia and Pontus. Further, at least one authority believes Julia Tertulla is his daughter. However, Julia Tertulla married Lucius Julius Marinus Caecilius Simplex, who was suffect consul in 101, which indicates either Julia was married at a very young age, or would be better considered Cornutus' sister. Further, Olli Salomies reports an unpublished inscription that proves Cornutus' wife was Plancia Magna (which explains how that element entered their son's name), and the full name of their son.

== Senatorial career ==
His career can be reconstructed from an inscription found in Tuscany. There is no information about which board Cornutus Tertullus served on as a member of the vigintiviri, so it may be possible he missed that office in his cursus honorum. The first office Cornutus is recorded as holding was urban quaestor, which was followed by aedile as he proceeded through the traditional republican magistracies, before being adlected as a praetor by Vespasian and Titus, likely during their censorship of AD 73/74. The specific reason that Cornutus received this promotion is not recorded; examining the evidence, George W. Houston could find no evidence of how he aided the Flavian cause during the Year of Four Emperors or the following year. One must be content with Suetonius' report that Vespasian found the Senate "weakened by frequent murders and longstanding neglect" and convinced that Cornutus was one of "the most eligible Italian and provincial candidates available."

With praetorian rank, Cornutus held two further offices, first as legate to the proconsular governor of Crete and Cyrenaica, then as governor of the public province of Gallia Narbonensis.

A gap of roughly twenty years follows. Cornutus could have quickly served in both of the offices mentioned during the reign of Vespasian, who died in the year 79; the next office Cornutus held was prefect of the aerarium Saturni from 98 to 100, with the Younger Pliny as his colleague. This gap spans the reign of Domitian. It is possible that Cornutus was out of favor with this suspicious Emperor, but Pliny supplies the answer: in his Panegyric to Trajan, Pliny notes that Cornutus declined to promote himself to the Emperor, thus refusing to hold offices during that Emperor's reign.

After Cornutus completed his service at the aerarium Saturni, he advanced to the office of suffect consul, which he also held with Pliny. Following this, Pliny's letters show that Cornutus was active in the Senate, taking part in the trial of Marius Priscus for mismanagement while proconsul of Africa, and defending Publicius Certus when Pliny prosecuted the former delator or informer. He was appointed curator Via Aemilia, an achievement Pliny excitedly reported to his friend Paternus the moment he learns of it. After this, Cornutus was tasked with conducting a census in Gallia Aquitania, which was followed with governorship of Bithynia and Pontus between 112 and 115. The acme of his career was when Cornutus was proconsular governor of Asia in 116/117.

The date of his death is unknown. If we assume Cornutus was around 30 when adlected as praetor (the legal age one held that magistracy) in 73/74, he would have been in his seventies when he concluded his term in Roman Asia, so it is likely Cornutus died not long after that.

Political offices
Preceded by Quintus Acutius Nerva, and Lucius Fabius Tuscus as suffect consul	Suffect Consul of the Roman Empire; 100 with Gaius Plinius Caecilius Secundus	Succeeded by Lucius Roscius Aelianus Maecius Celer, and Tiberius Claudius Sacerdos Julianus as suffect consul
