= Marcus Plancius Varus =

1st century Anatolian Roman, senator and governor

Marcus Plancius Varus was an Anatolian Roman noble who lived in the 1st century in the Roman Empire. His paternal ancestors were originally from Latium in Central Italy. They had immigrated to Anatolia in the time of the late Roman Republic. Varus came from a local, wealthy family who were prominent and they came from an unknown town in Galatia. His family owned large estates in Galatia. Apart from this, not much is known on the family and early life of Varus.

== History ==
Between the years of 56–69, Varus served as a Praetor during the reign of the Roman Emperor Nero. He entered the Roman Senate as a praetor and through this entry, became a Roman Senator. After his service as a praetor, Varus implied treasonable behavior by a Roman called Dolabella. A Roman woman called Triaria (second wife of Lucius Vitellius the younger and sister-in-law to the brief future Roman Emperor Aulus Vitellius) terrified the City Prefect Titus Flavius Sabinus (brother to future Roman Emperor Vespasian) warning Sabinus not to seek a reputation for clemency by endangering Nero.

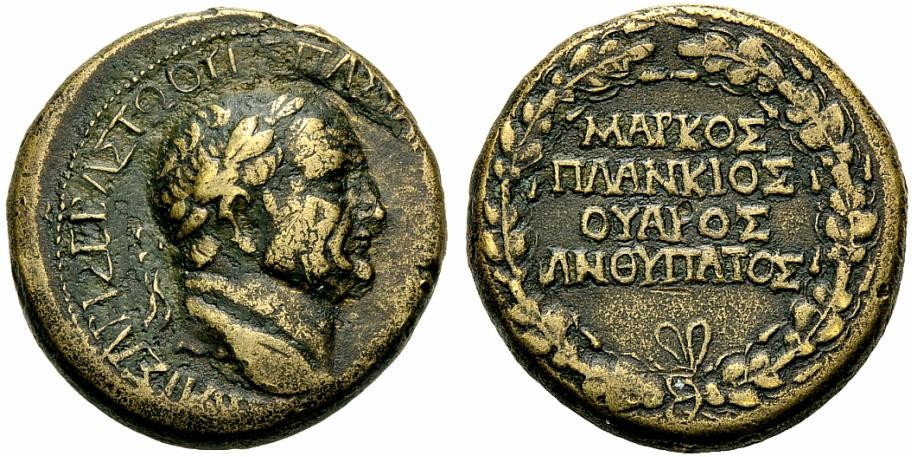
Coin struck under Varus, showing the profile of Emperor Vespasian, and the inscription "Marcus Plancius Varus Proconsul" in Greek

During the reign of Roman Emperor Vespasian (69-79), Varus served as governor of the public province of Bithynia and Pontus. During his time in Nicaea, Varus had struck coinage honoring the Roman State and himself.

Julia became a priestess and served in the temple of the Ancient Greek Goddess Artemis in Perga. Artemis was the most important Goddess in Perga. In Perga, the city's most magnificent structure was the Hellenistic Gate that was the entrance to the city. Inside in the courtyard of the Hellenistic Gate, there are inscribed bases of statues that bear the names of Marcus Plancius Varus and his son.

From these inscriptions it is understood that Varus, along with his son were wealthy, influential and generous citizens in Perga. Varus and his son were made benefactors whom they contributed to the prosperity of Perga. Due to the goodness and generosity of Varus and his son, they were both accepted as the second founders of the city. For who they were both honored with the title ‘’Ktistes’’ or ’’Founder’‘.

Varus also had contributed to the construction of the North Gate of Nicaea/İznik, now called Istanbul Gate, that was built between 70-71. He had appeared to have died before 81. There is a possibility that Varus could be buried west of this Gate. His epitaph was written and dedicated in common Emperorship by Vespasian and his son Titus. Varus’ epitaph is preserved inside the Istanbul Gate. His epitaph was written in metal letters:

Proconsul M. Plancius Varus devoted this monument to Nicaea capital of state and exalted home of emperors, which the monument is completed by effort of Gaius Cassius Chrestus.

== Family ==
At unknown date, Varus married the Herodian Princess Julia, the daughter of King Tigranes VI of Armenia and sister of prince Gaius Julius Alexander. Julia bore Varus two children:

- Son, Gaius Plancius Varus, consul during the reign of Roman Emperor Hadrian.
- Daughter, Plancia Magna, who married the Roman Senator Gaius Julius Cornutus Tertullus. Plancia Magna was a prominent patron and prominent citizen in Perga.

== Sources ==
- https://web.archive.org/web/20050104093812/http://www.iznik.bel.tr/bld-gov/eng/eistkapi.htm
- https://web.archive.org/web/20080509195203/http://www.serifyenen.com/heritage_Summer2005.asp
- Richard A Bauman, Crime and Punishment in Ancient Rome, (Routledge, 2005) ISBN 0-415-11375-X, p. 86
- Tacitus, Histories II.63
- Grainger, John D. (2003). Nerva and the Roman succession Crisis AD 96-99. London, New York: Routledge. pp. xvi. ISBN 0-415-28917-3. OCLC 52012210.
- Plancia Magna, Aurelia Paulina, and Regilla: Civic Donors, Vroma.org, Barbara F. McManus
