= Perga =

Ancient Greek city

- Parha (Hittite); Πέργη (in Ancient Greek); Perge (in Turkish)
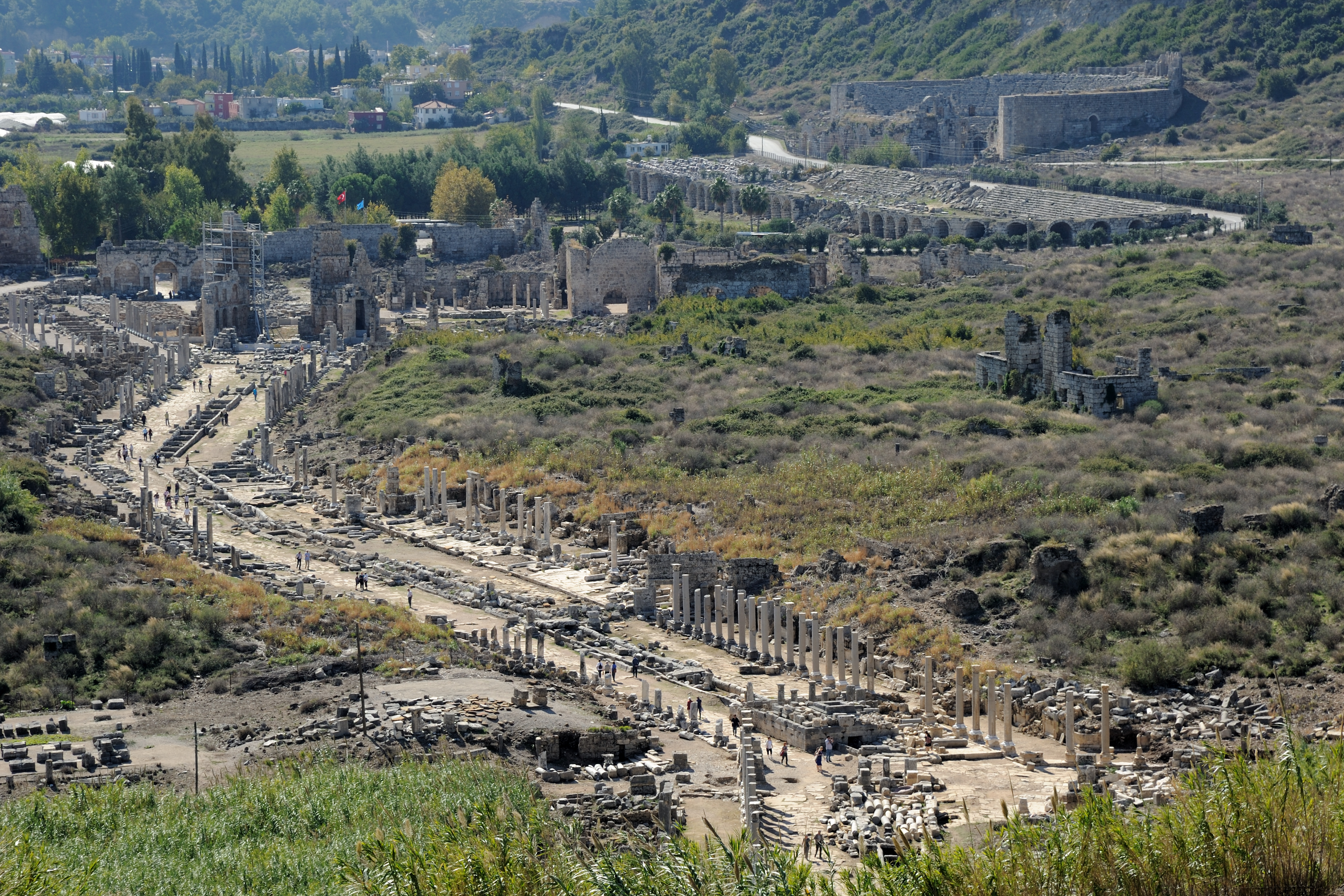
- Overview of Perga

- Location within Turkey
- 36°57′41″N 30°51′14″E
- Type: Settlement
- Periods: Chalcolithic Age to Middle Ages
- Cultures: Luwian; Lycian; Hittite; Greek; Roman; Byzantine; Turkish
- Associated with: Apollonius
- Location: Aksu, Antalya, Turkey
- Region: Lukka; Pamphylia

History
- Built: By 1209 BC

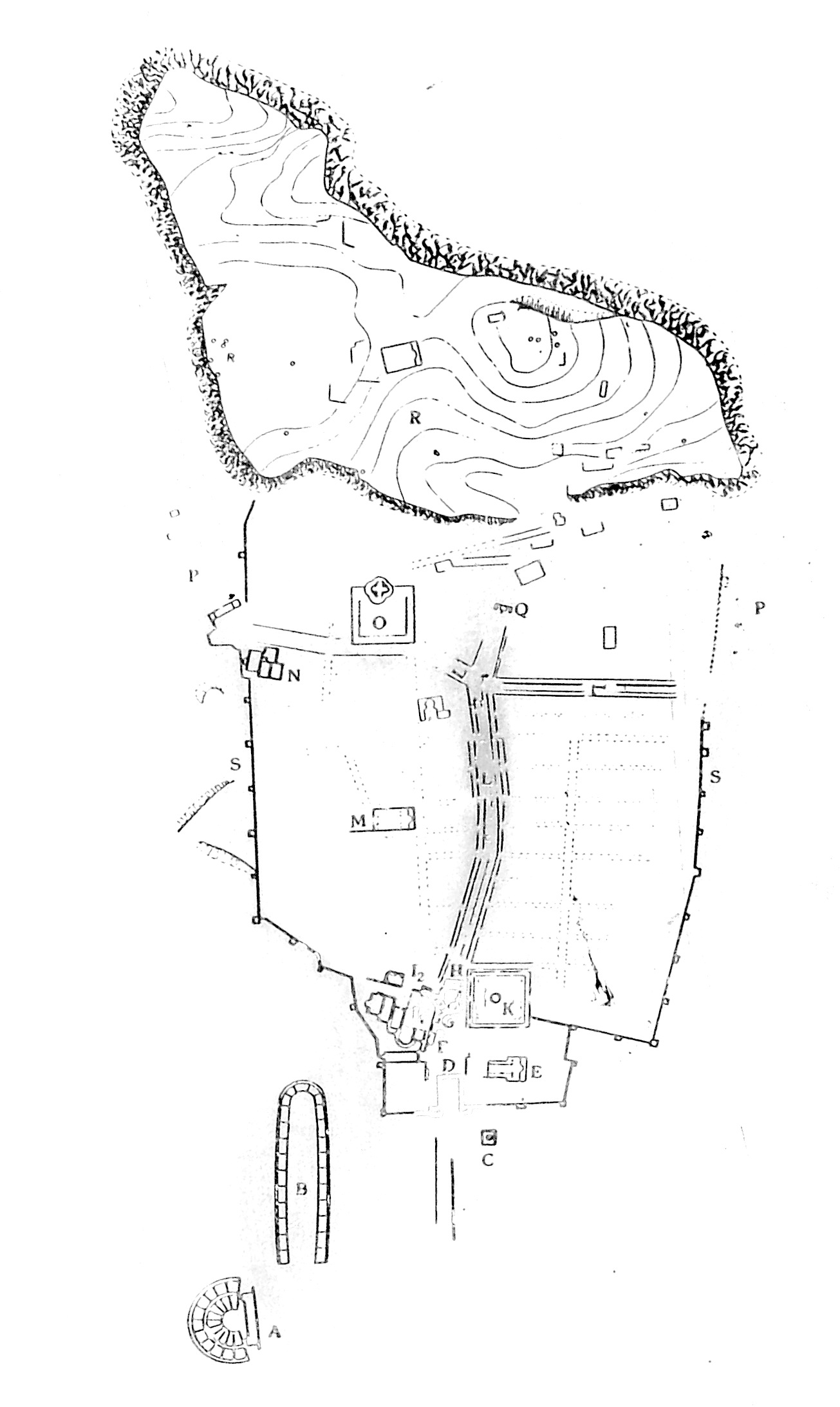
Plan of Perge

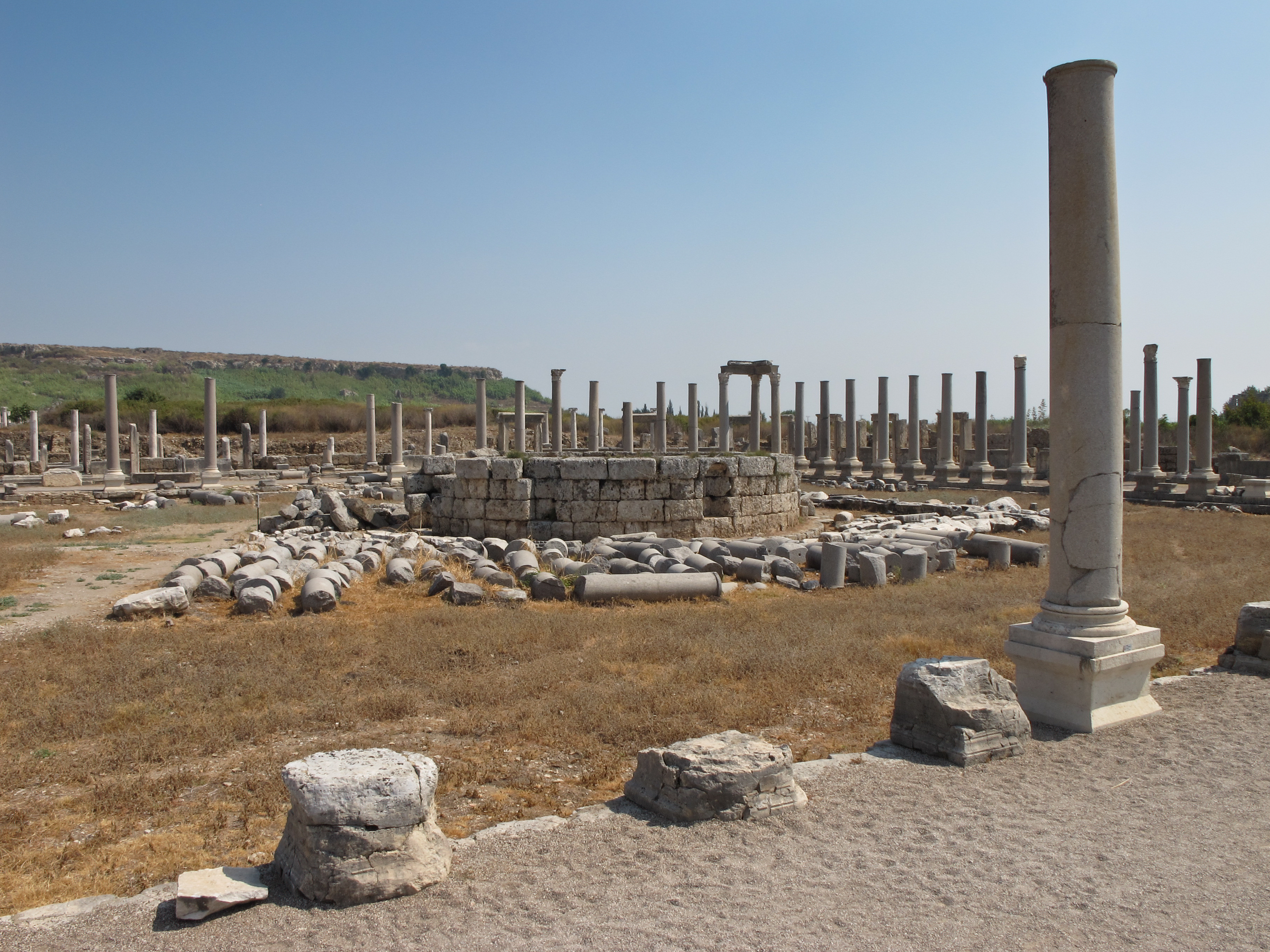
The agora

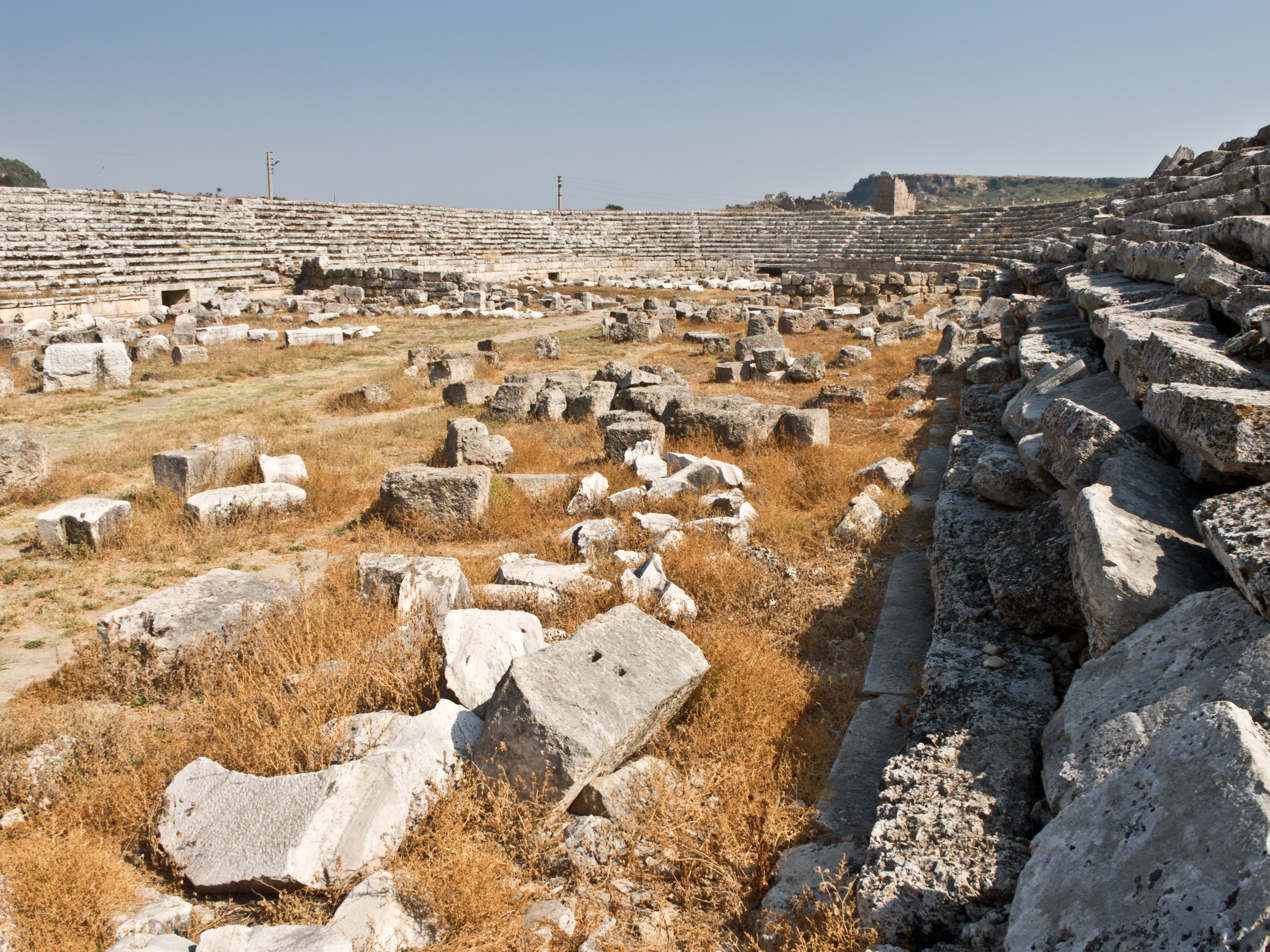
The stadium

Perga or Perge (Hittite: Parha, (Note: See:) Greek: Πέργη Perge, Turkish: Perge) was originally an ancient Lycian settlement (Note: See:) that later became a Greek city in Pamphylia. It was the capital of the Roman province of Pamphylia Secunda, now located in Antalya Province on the southwestern Mediterranean coast of Turkey. Today its ruins lie 15 kilometres (9.3 mi) east of Antalya.

It was the birthplace of Apollonius of Perga, one of the most notable ancient Greek mathematicians for his work on conic sections. A unique and prominent feature for a Roman city was the long central water channel in the centre of the main street which contained a series of cascading pools and which would have been remarkable even today in a semi-arid area where summer temperatures reach over 30 degrees Celsius.

== History ==
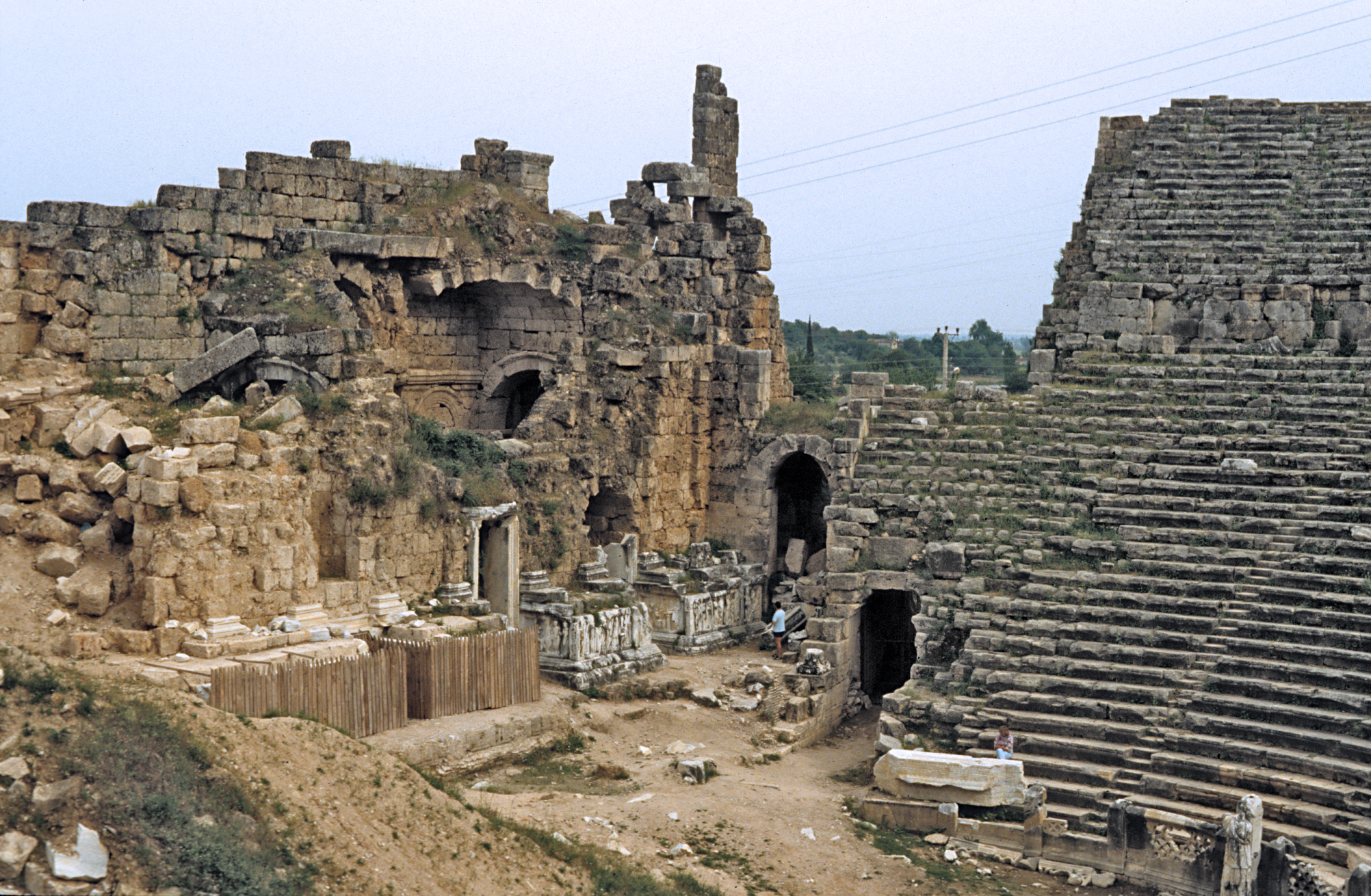
The Roman theatre

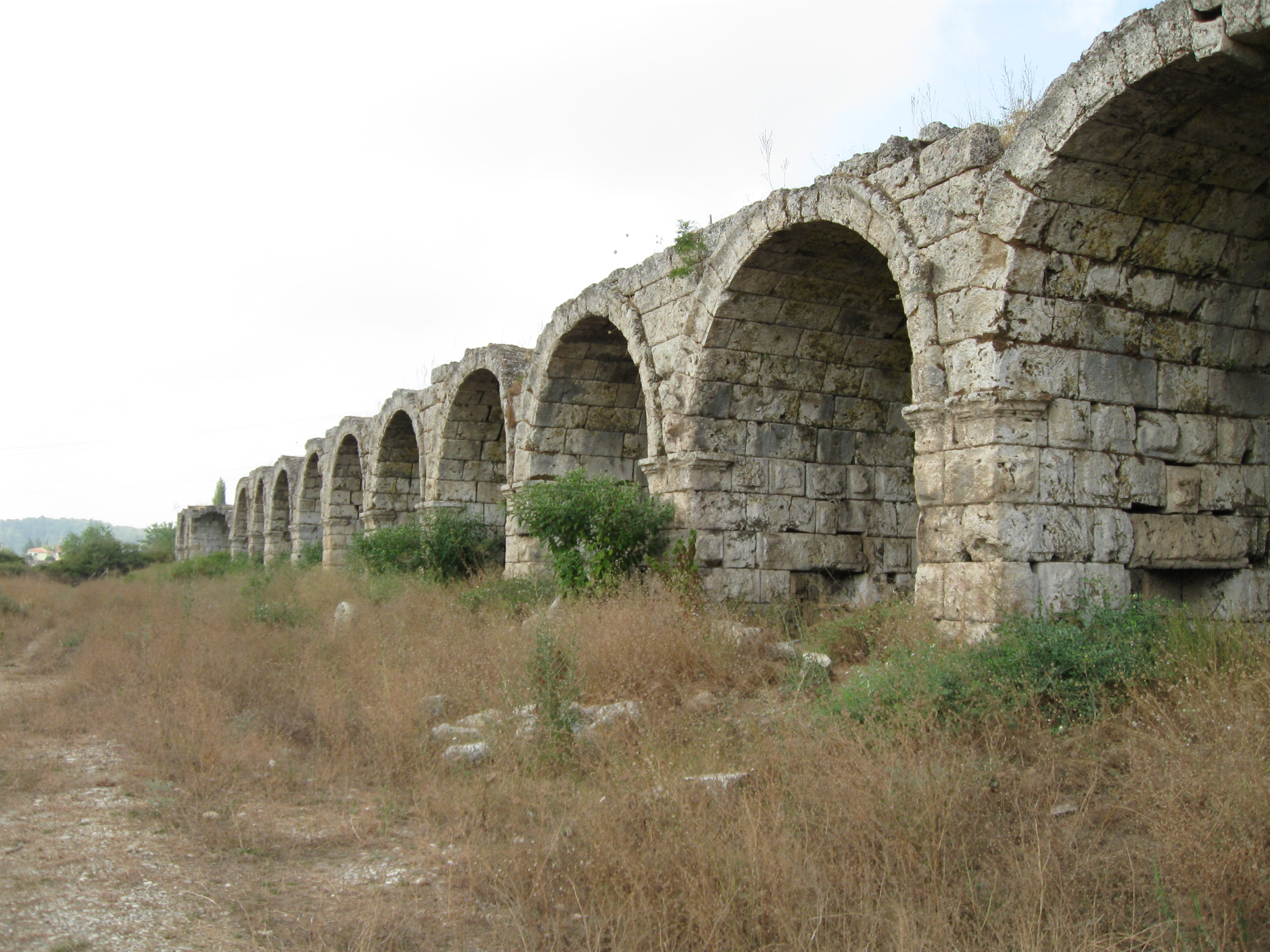
The stadium

Perge was situated on the coastal plain between the Rivers Catarrhactes (Düden Nehri) and Cestrus (Aksu), about 11 km from the mouth of the latter.

=== Early Bronze ===
The history of the city dates back to the Late Chalcolitic Era or Early Bronze Age. Excavations in the original settlement on the acropolis date it to the early Bronze Age, 4000-3000 BC. Pottery found in the Perga Acropolis is linked to the Early Bronze Age pottery traditions in Western Anatolia.

=== Late Bronze ===
From a bronze tablet discovered in 1986 in Hattusas, a treaty between the Hittite Great King Tudhaliya IV and his vassal, the king of Tarhuntassa, defined the latter's western border at the city "Parha" and the "Kastaraya River". The river is assumed to be the classical Cestrus. West of Parha were the "Lukka Lands". Parha likely spoke a late Luwian dialect like Lycian and that of the neo-Hittite kingdoms.

=== Iron Age ===
The settlement probably became a Greek colony of Rhodes in the 7th c. BC. Perge was later a Pamphylian Greek city, and came under successive rule by Persians, Athenians, and Persians again.

In 540 BC Perga, along with the other cities in Pamphylia was captured by the Achaemenid Empire. During the reign of Darius I, it was a part of the Satrapy of Ionia. There is no archeological evidence that shows the Achaemenid rule over Pamphylia but some classical sources do exist. Herodotus mentions that Pamphlyians sent aid to the military campaign of Xerxes against the Greeks, so it must have been under the control of the Achaemenids. According to Diodorus Siculus, Perge was one of the cities that rebelled against the Achaemenid rule during the Great Satraps' Revolt in 360 BC.

Alexander the Great, after taking Phaselis, was welcomed in Perge with his army in 334 BC. Alexander's rule was followed by the Diadochi empire of the Seleucids. The walls around the lower city were built in the period starting from 223 BC. In the 2nd century BC the city became prosperous and started minting its own coins with the image of Artemis and her temple. Perge became renowned for the worship of Artemis, whose temple stood on a hill outside the town, and in whose honour annual festivals were celebrated.

Following the defeat of the Seleucids by the Romans in 188 BC, the wider area was gifted by the Romans to the Attalid kingdom. When its last king died without heirs in 133 BC, he bequeathed his kingdom, including Perga, to the Roman Republic. After 25 BC, the Romans built the Via Sebaste linking Pisidian Antioch in Galatia with Perge. When the Romans first incorporated Perga into the Empire, the city was a part of the Province of Galatia. After the Flavian Dynasty was founded by Emperor Vespasian, the city became a part of the Lycia et Pamphylia province. Vespasian also granted the city the rank of neocorate which made the city in charge of the imperial cult.

During the 2nd century AD there was a construction boom in the city, fueled by Pax Romana and excessive wealth. The city center was expanded to the South side of the city and new monuments were erected. Perga also had many philanthropists during the Roman Empire period who financed the construction of monumental structures.

Under the Romans from the 1st to the 3rd century AD the town became a magnificent city with many impressive buildings. It became one of the most beautiful towns in Anatolia, competing with Side for the status of most important town in Pamphylia. Plancia Magna (d. 122), daughter of the governor Marcus Plancius Varus, was the greatest benefactor and instigator of public buildings and was honoured with statues erected by the town council. In 46 AD, according to the Acts of the Apostles, St. Paul journeyed to Perga. Paul and Barnabas came to Perge during their first missionary journey, but probably stayed there only a short time, and do not seem to have preached there; it was there that John Mark left Paul to return to Jerusalem. On his return from Pisidia, Paul preached at Perge. As the Cestrus silted up over the late Roman era, Perga declined as a secular city. In the first half of the 4th century, during the reign of Constantine the Great (324-337), Perga became an important centre of Christianity, which soon became the official religion of the Roman Empire. The city retained its status as a Christian centre in the 5th and 6th centuries. St. Matrona of Perge of the 6th century was a female saint known for temporarily cross-dressing to avoid her abusive husband. She also is known for opposing the Monophysite policy of the emperor Anastasios I. Matrona hid in the monastery of St. Bassion as the enuch Babylos. Once revealed, she was sent to a woman's monastery where she was head of the convent. She was famous for her miraculous gift of healing. She went on to found a nunnery in Constantinople. St Matrona died at the age of 100. Her life was told through a vita prima whose author and exact time period remains a mystery.

The Greek Notitiae episcopatuum mentions the city as metropolis of Pamphylia Secunda until the 13th century. Le Quien gives the names of 11 of its bishops: Epidaurus, present at the Council of Ancyra in 312; Callicles at the First Council of Nicaea in 325; Berenianus, at Constantinople (426); Epiphanius at the Second Council of Ephesus (449), at the First Council of Chalcedon (451), and a signatory of the letter from the bishops of the province to Emperor Leo (458); Hilarianus, at a council at Constantinople in 536; Eulogius, at the Second Council of Constantinople in 553; Apergius, condemned as a Monothelite at the Third Council of Constantinople in 680; John, at the Trullan council in 692; Sisinnius Pastillas about 754 (an iconoclast who was condemned at the Second Council of Nicaea in 787); Constans, at the same council of that condemned his predecessor; John, at the Council of Constantinople of 869–70.

No longer a residential, the bishopric is included in the Catholic Church's list of titular sees.

Perga remained inhabited until the foundation of the Seljuk Empire in roughly 1100.

== City monuments ==
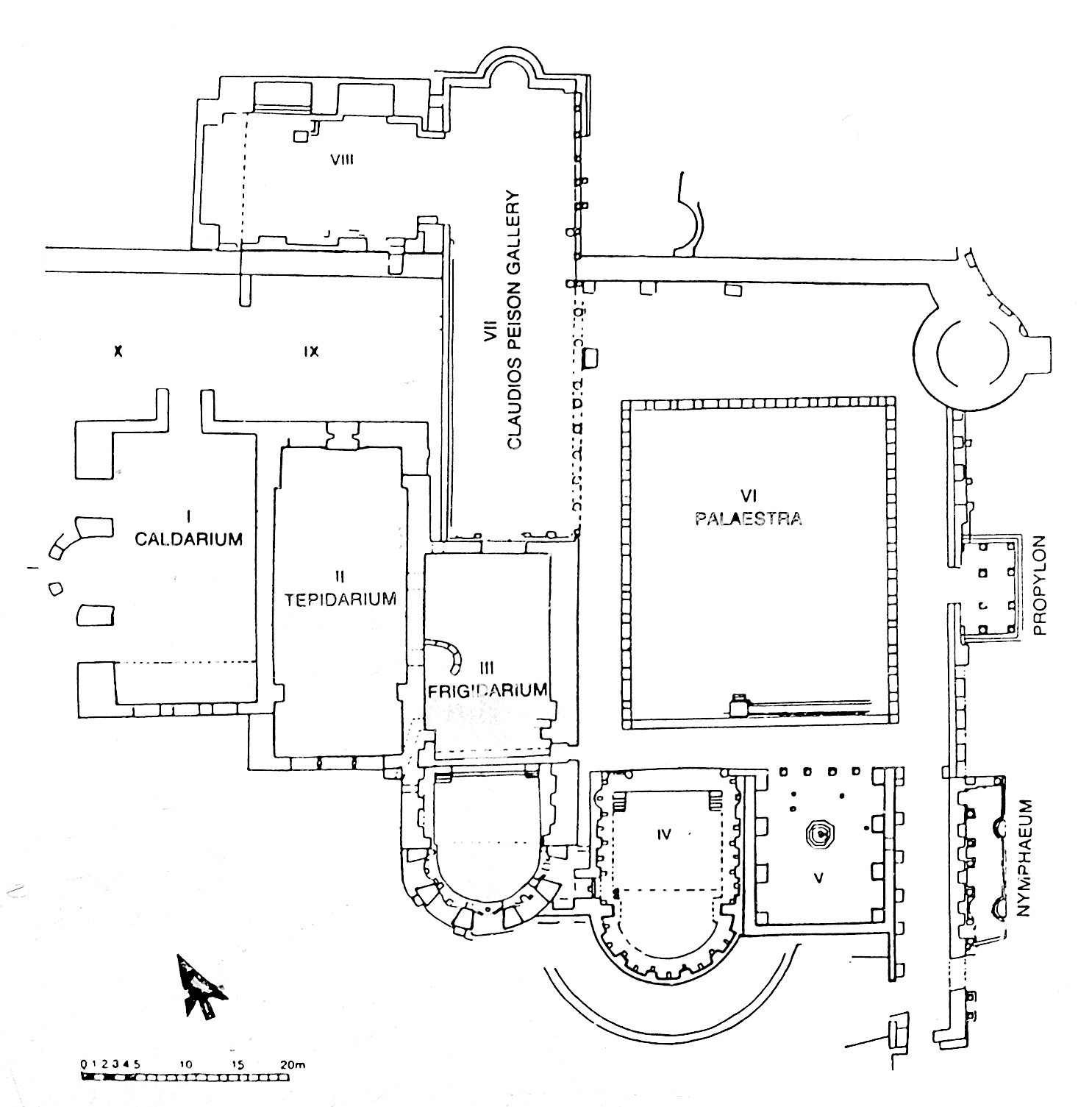
South baths plan

Excavations started in 1946 and have uncovered many monumental buildings: a theatre, a stadium, palaestra, a temple of Artemis and two churches. The temple of Artemis was located outside the town. Many of the coins struck in the city portrayed both the goddess and her sanctuary.

The Hellenistic walls date from the 3rd c. BC and had 3 gates. The south gate is particularly monumental and includes 2 towers 3 storeys high with conical roofs and a horseshoe-shaped square behind. Under Hadrian in 121 AD, a triumphal arch was inserted into the northern wall of the courtyard and the facades were covered in precious marbles and decorated with columns and statues.

One of the most impressive monuments is the theatre which lies outside the walls near the stadium. It is larger than those of Myra and Patara.

The south baths created in the 1st c. AD is one of the best preserved buildings and is noteworthy for its size and monumentality, and for the large collection of sculptures found there.

Perge has been dubbed as “Turkey's second Zeugma” for the alluring appearance of the mosaics that have been unearthed so far. In 2003 archaeologists discovered well-preserved Greek mosaics showing Oceanus and Medusa. In 2017 a mosaic depicting the sacrifice of Iphigenia was discovered.

The city was eventually supplied in the Roman era by 2 aqueducts. The Kursunlu aqueduct was 11 km long and probably built to supply baths from close to the Kursunlu waterfall. A later aqueduct of 21 km length used a greater flow from the Duden river near the Dudenbasi waterfall.

Perge had at least 6 nymphaea, the most striking being the northern, or "Hadrian's", nymphaeum (about 122 AD) and the southern nymphaeum in the square of Septimius Severus (end 2nd to early 3rd c. AD). Hadrian's nymphaeum was beautifully decorated with numerous sculptures including the river god Cestrus under whom water cascaded. It is located at the edge of the acropolis to capture the outflow of the abundant water supply and from there fed the channel that flowed through the city. The southern nymphaeum faces the courtyard of Septimius Severus and is next to the propylon (monumental entrance) of the southern baths whose hydraulic system provided it with water.

A full-body statue of a dressed female was revealed by archaeologists headed by Sedef Cokay Kepçe in 2020. The statue, believed to have been made during the Roman Empire, will be on display at the Antalya Museum.

== Notable people ==
One of Perga's most celebrated ancient inhabitants was the mathematician Apollonius (c.262 BC – c.190 BC). He wrote a series of eight books describing a family of curves known as conic sections, comprising the circle, ellipse, parabola, and hyperbola.

Plancia Magna, a local noblewoman and priestess of Artemis, expanded the Hellenistic-era gates into the monumental gate complex in the early second century AD.

About 80 years later at the turn of the third century, another local noblewoman and priestess of Artemis, Aurelia Paulina, sponsored another monumental building project: the two-story nymphaeum south of the Hellenistic gates.

== See also ==
- List of ancient Greek cities
