= Pamphylia =

Ancient maritime district of southern Anatolia, in present Turkey

Coordinates: 37°N 31°E

Pamphylia (Παμφυλία)
- Ancient Region of Anatolia
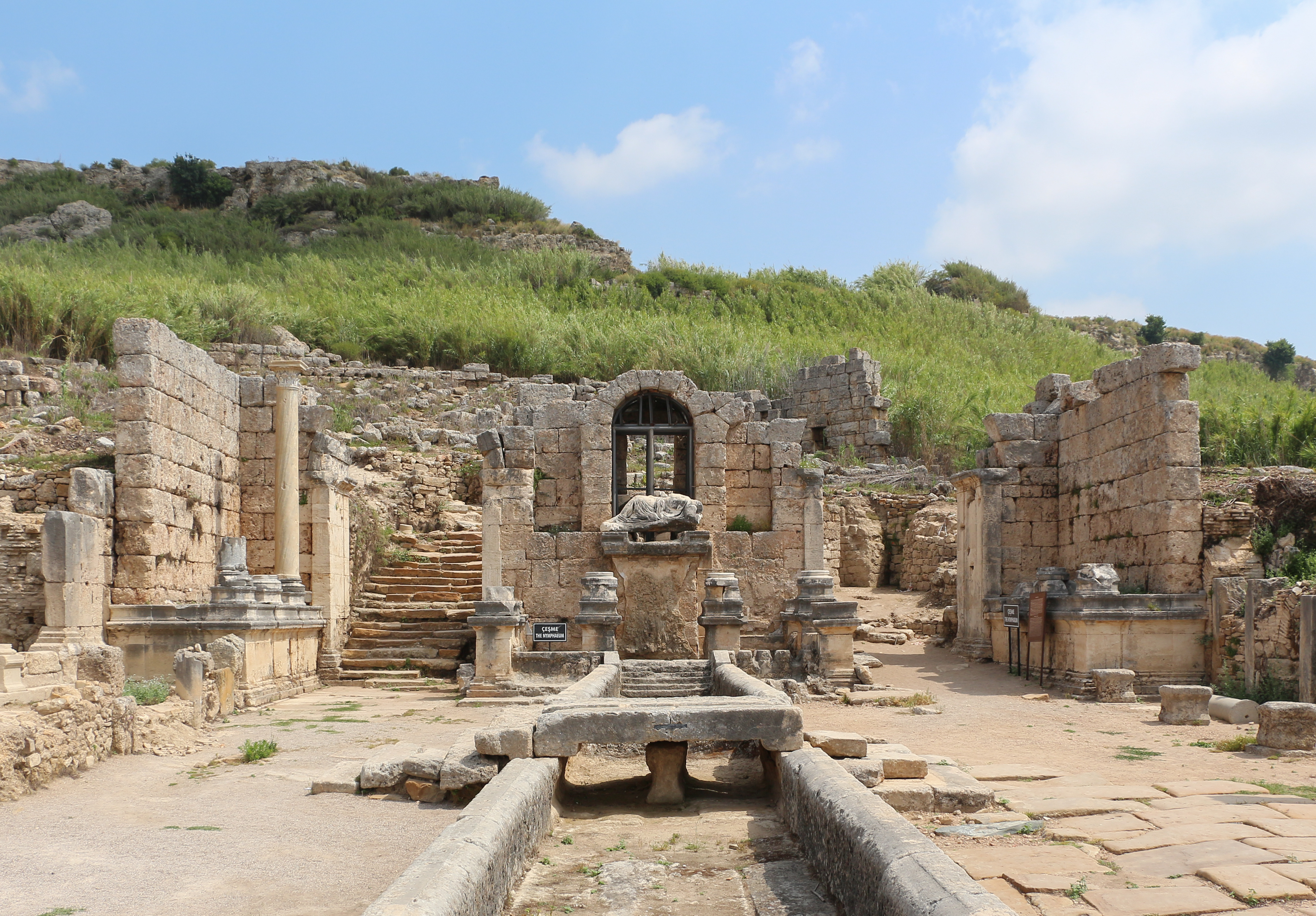
- Ruins of the main street in Perga, capital of Pamphylia
- Location: Southern Anatolia (modern-day Turkey)
- State existed: -
- Nation: Pamphylians, Pisidians, Greeks
- Historical capitals: Perga (Aksu), Attaleia (Antalya)
- Roman province: Pamphylia
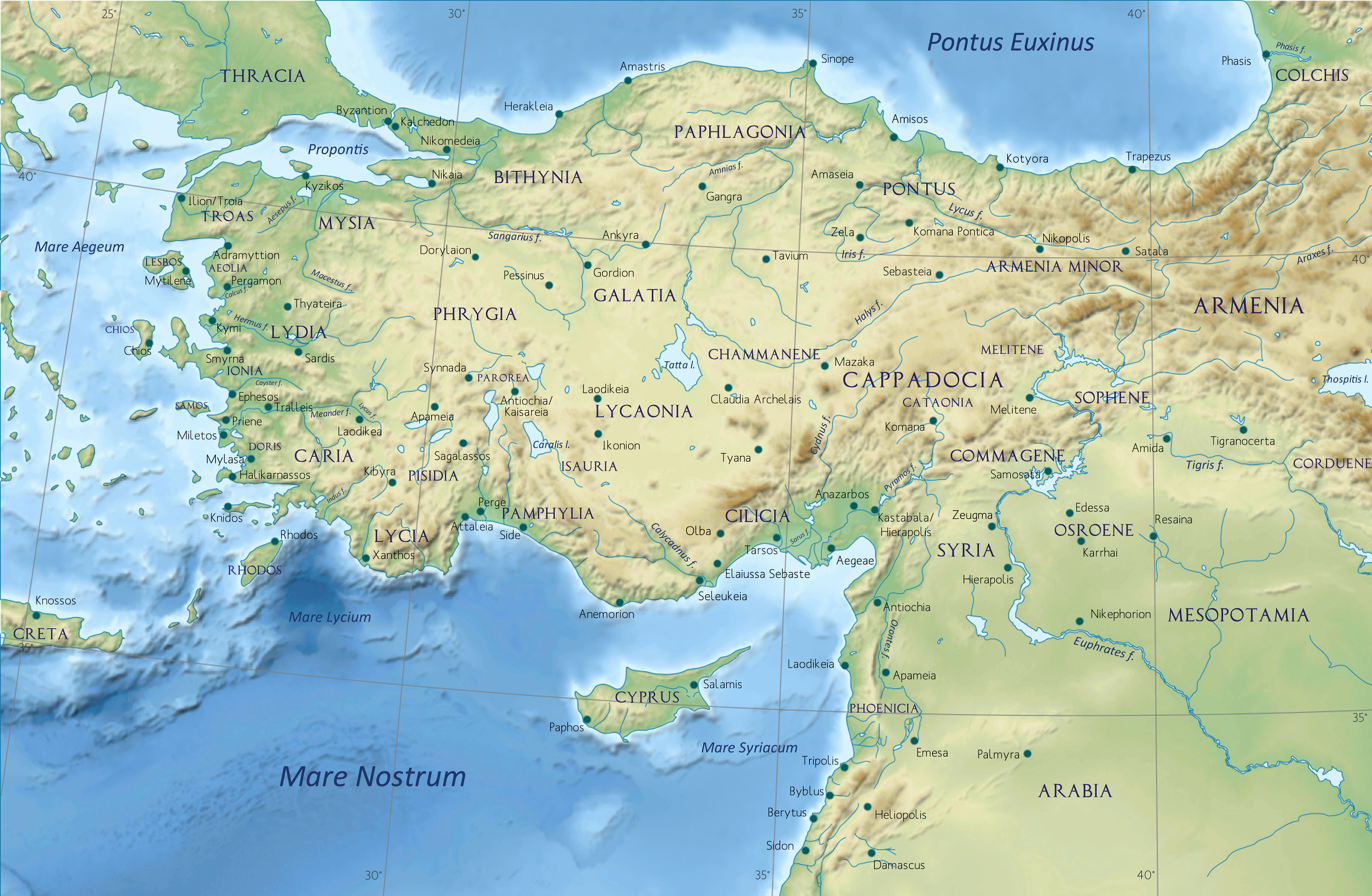
- Anatolia/Asia Minor in the Greco-Roman period. The classical regions, including Pamphylia, and their main settlements.

Pamphylia (/pæmˈfɪliə/; Ancient Greek: Παμφυλία, Pamphylía Turkish: Pamfilya) was a region in the south of Asia Minor in Western Asia, between Lycia and Cilicia, extending from the Mediterranean to Mount Taurus (all in modern-day Antalya province, Turkey). It was bounded on the north by Pisidia and was therefore a country of small extent, having a coast-line of only about 120 km (75 miles) with a breadth of about 50 km (30 miles). Under the Roman administration the term Pamphylia was extended so as to include Pisidia and the whole tract up to the frontiers of Phrygia and Lycaonia, and in this wider sense it is employed by Ptolemy.

== Name ==
The name Pamphylia comes from the Greek Παμφυλία, itself from Ancient Greek: πάμφυλος (pamphylos), literally "of mingled tribes or races", a compound of πᾶν (pan), neuter of πᾶς (pas) "all" + φυλή (phylē), "race, tribe". Herodotus derived its etymology from a Dorian tribe, the Pamphyloi (Πάμφυλοι), who were said to have colonized the region. The tribe, in turn, was said to be named after Pamphylos (Greek: Πάμφυλος), son of Aigimios.

== Origins of the Pamphylians ==
According to Encyclopædia Britannica, the Pamphylians were “a mixture of aboriginal inhabitants, immigrant Cilicians (Greek: Κίλικες) and Greeks”. However, Herodotus and Strabo record that the Pamphylians were descended from Greeks who came with Calchas and Amphilochos after the Trojan War. Additionally, Pausanias states that they were a Greek race. Theopompus, as well, informs us that Pamphylia was inhabited by Greeks. Some modern scholars suggest that they migrated to Pamphylia from Arcadia and generally the Peloponnese in the 12th century BC. The significance of the Greek contribution to the origin of the Pamphylians can be attested alike by tradition and archaeology, and Pamphylia can be considered a Greek country from the early Iron Age until the early Middle Ages.

There can be little doubt that the Pamphylians and Pisidians were the same people, though the former had received colonies from Greece and other lands, and from this cause, combined with the greater fertility of their territory, had become more civilized than their neighbours in the interior. But the distinction between the two seems to have been established at an early period. Herodotus, who does not mention the Pisidians, enumerates the Pamphylians among the nations of Asia Minor, while Ephorus mentions them both, correctly including the one among the nations on the coast, the other among those of the interior.

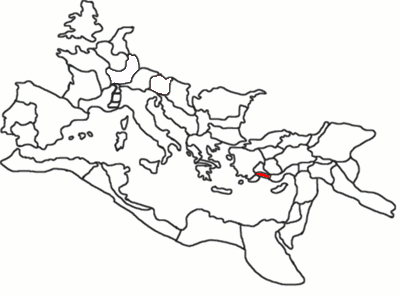
A map showing Pamphylia's location within the Roman Empire

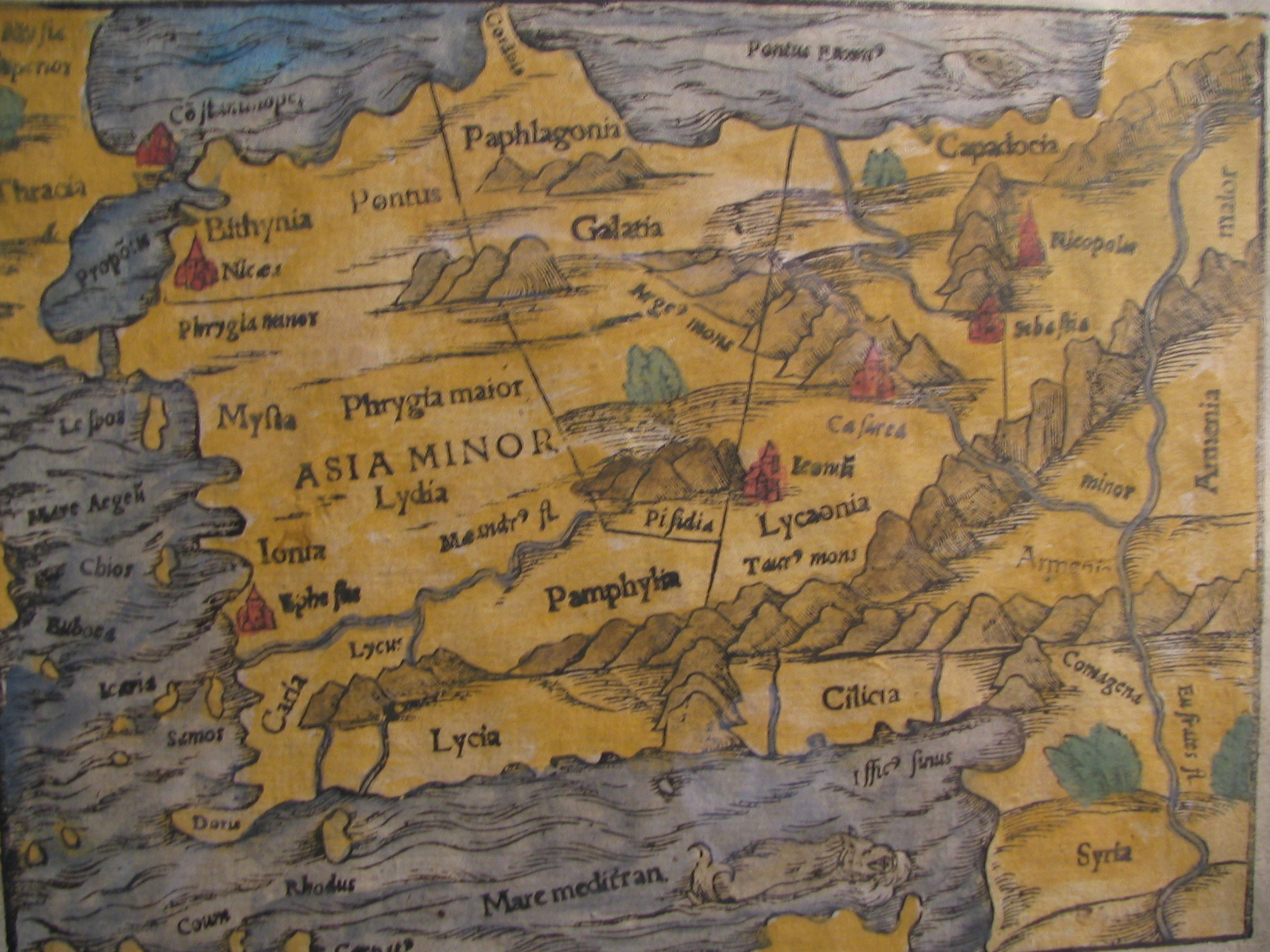
15th-century map showing Pamphylia

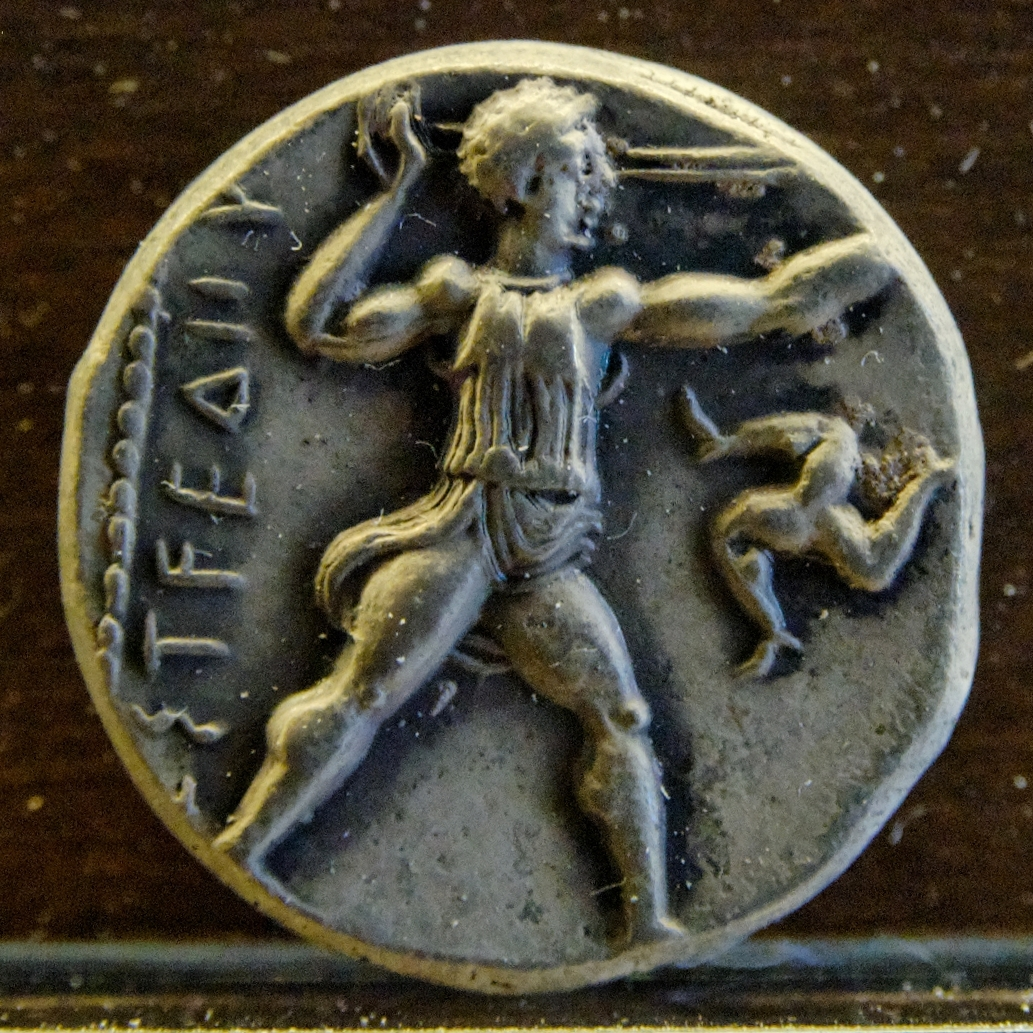
Slinger standing left, triskelion to right; reverse of a silver stater from Aspendos, Pamphylia

A number of scholars have distinguished in the Pamphylian dialect important isoglosses with both Arcadian and Cypriot (Arcadocypriot Greek) which allow them to be studied together with the group of dialects sometimes referred to as Achaean since it was settled not only by Achaean tribes but also colonists from other Greek-speaking regions, Dorians and Aeolians. The legend related by Herodotus and Strabo, which ascribed the origin of the Pamphylians to a colony led into their country by Amphilochus and Calchas after the Trojan War, is merely a characteristic myth.

== History ==
=== Late Bronze Age ===
During the Late Bronze Age, the region was on the western edge of the Hittite sphere of influence. A treaty between the Hittite king Tudḫaliya IV and his vassal, the king of Tarḫuntašša, defined the latter's western border at the city Parha in later Pamphylia and the Kastaraya River. West of Parha were the Lukka lands.

=== Iron Age ===
In the historical era, the region's population spoke Pamphylian, an idiosyncratic dialect of Greek seemingly influenced by Anatolian languages spoken nearby. On Cyrus's defeat of Croesus, Pamphylia passed to the Persian Empire. Darius included it in his first tax-district alongside Lycia, Magnesia, Ionia, Aeolia, Mysia, and Caria. At some point between 468 and 465 BC, the Athenians under Cimon fought the Persians at the Eurymedon, and won; thus adding Pamphylia to their "Delian League" empire. Toward the end of the Peloponnesian War, the Athenians were weakened enough that the Persians were able to retake it.

Upon Alexander the Great's defeat of Darius III, Pamphylia passed back to Greek rule. After the defeat of Antiochus III in 190 BC they were included among the provinces annexed by the Romans to the dominions of Eumenes of Pergamum; but somewhat later they joined with the Pisidians and Cilicians in piratical ravages, and Side became the chief centre and slave mart of these freebooters. Pamphylia was for a short time included in the dominions of Amyntas, king of Galatia, but after his death lapsed into a district of a Roman province.

As of 1911, the district was largely peopled with recently settled Ottoman Muslims from Greece, Crete, and the Balkans, as a result of the long-term consequences of the Congress of Berlin and the collapse of the Ottoman Empire.

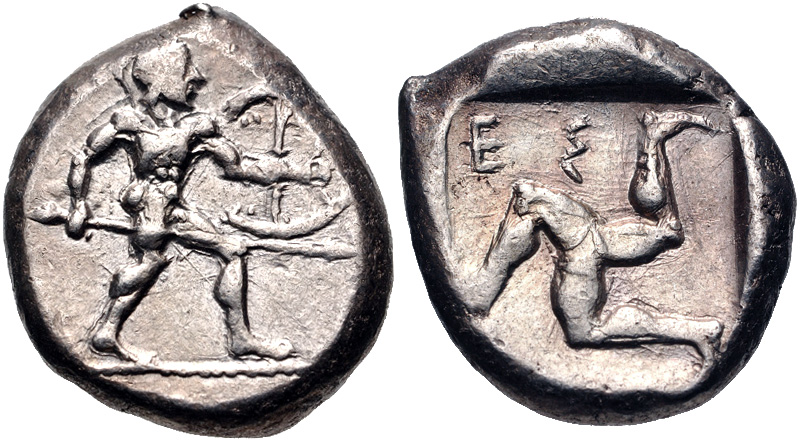
Coin of Aspendos, Pamphylia, circa 465-430 BC

== Notable people from Pamphylia ==
- Diodorus of Aspendos, Pythagorean philosopher (4th century BC)
- Apollonius of Perga, astronomer, mathematician (c. 262 - c. 190 BC)
- Artemidorus of Perga, proxenos in Oropos (c. 240 -180 BC)
- Aetos (son of Apollonius) from Aspendos, Ptolemaic commander, founder of Arsinoe (Cilicia) (c. 238 BC)
- Mnaseas (son of Artemon) from Side, sculptor (end 3rd century BC)
- Orestas (son of Erymneus) from Aspendos, proxenos in Dreros (Crete), (end 3rd - beginning 2nd century BC)
- Thymilus of Aspendos, stadion (distance of 180–190 m) running race victor (winner) in Olympics 176 BC
- Apollonios (son of Koiranos) from Aspendos, Ptolemaic commander, proxenos in Lappa and Aptera (Crete) (1st half - 2nd century BC)
- Asclepiades (son of Myron) from Perga, physician honoured by the people of Seleucia (3rd - 2nd century BC)
- Plancia Magna from Perga, influential citizen, benefactress, high-priestess of Artemis (1st and 2nd century AD)
- Menodora (daughter of Megacles) from Sillyon, magistrate and benefactor (c. 2nd century AD)
- Zenon (son of Theodorus) from Aspendos, architect of the Aspendos theatre (2nd century AD)
- Apollonius of Aspendos (son of Apollonius), poet (2nd/early 3rd century AD)
- Aurelia Paulina from Perga, prominent noblewoman of Syrian origin, donator, high-priestess of Artemis (2nd and 3rd century AD)
- Probus from Side, martyr (died c. 304 AD)
- Philip of Side, historian (c. 380 - after 431)
- Matrona of Perge, saint, abbess of Constantinople, (late 5th - early 6th century AD)
- Antony I Kassymatas from Sillyon, patriarch of Constantinople (c. 780 - 837)

== Archaeological sites ==
- Antalya
- Aspendos
- Etenna
- Eurymedon Bridge at Aspendos, a Roman bridge which was reconstructed by the Seljuks and follows a zigzag course over the river
- Eurymedon Bridge at Selge, a Roman bridge
- Perga
- Side
- Sillyon

== See also ==
- Ancient regions of Anatolia
- Myth of Er
- Pamphylian Greek
