= Seven Archangels =

Concept found in some works of early Jewish literature and Christianity

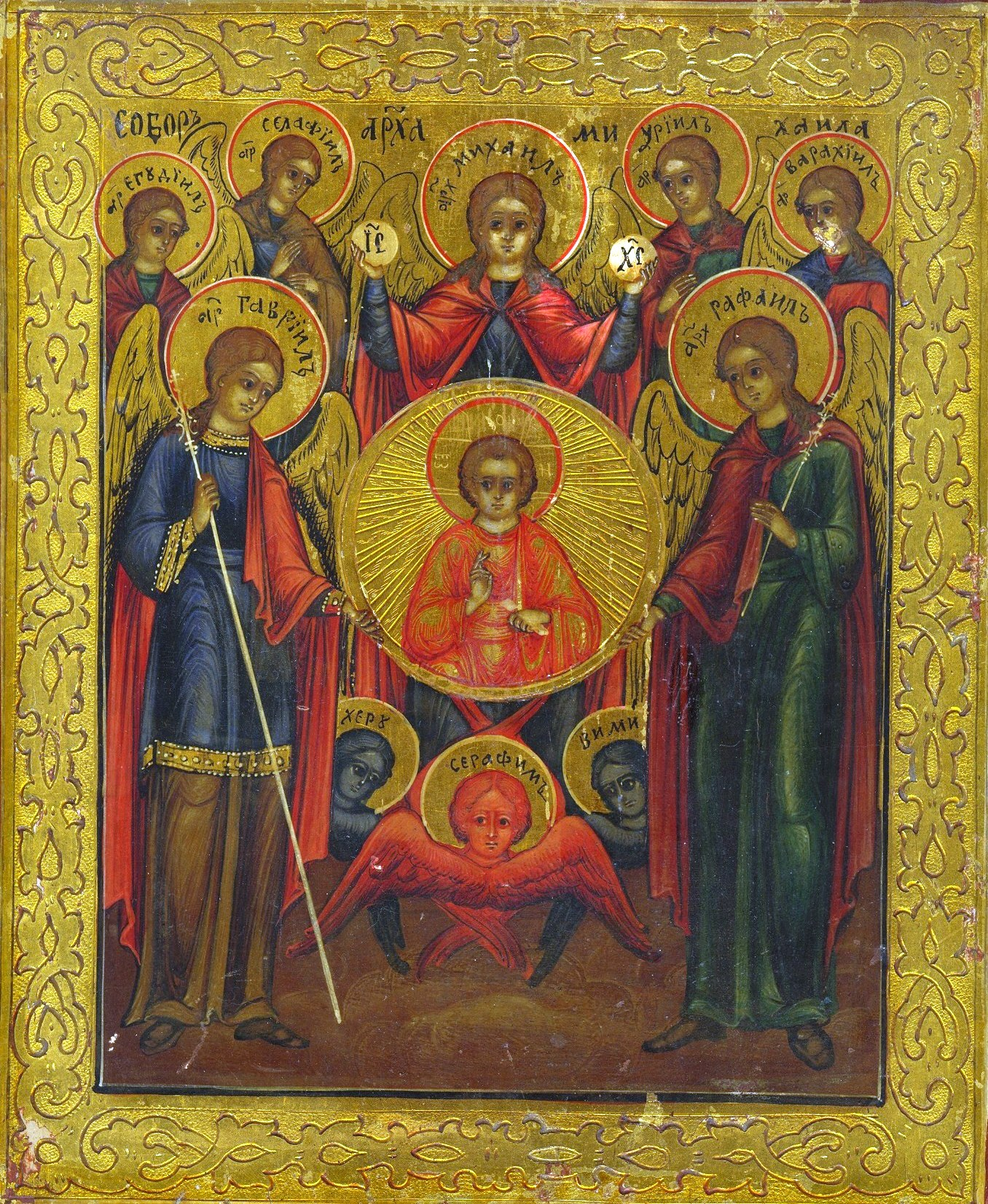
Synaxis of the Archangel Michael (Собор Архистратига Михаила). An Eastern Orthodox Church icon of the "Seven Archangels." From left to right: Jegudiel, Gabriel (גַּבְרִיאֵל), Selaphiel, Michael, Uriel, Raphael, and Barachiel. Beneath the mandorla of Christ Emmanuel are representations of Cherubim (in blue) and Seraphim (in red).

The concept of Seven Archangels is found in some works of early Jewish literature and in Christianity. In those texts, they are referenced as the angels who serve God directly.

The Catholic Church venerates seven archangels: in Latin Christianity, three are invoked by name (Michael, Gabriel, and Raphael) while the Eastern Catholic Churches name seven. Lutheranism and Anglicanism's traditions generally recognize four known archangels: Michael, Gabriel, Raphael and sometimes Uriel. Most Protestant churches often venerate only Gabriel and Michael.

In the Coptic tradition, the Seven Archangels are Michael, Gabriel, Raphael, Surael, Zadkiel, Sarathael, and Ananael. In parts of Oriental Orthodox Christianity and Eastern Orthodox Christianity, Eight Archangels may be honoured, including Michael, Gabriel, Raphael, Uriel, as well as Salathiel, Jegudiel, Barachiel, and Jeremiel. The Eight Archangels are commemorated on the Feast of the Archangels.

== Bible ==
The term archangel itself is not found in the Hebrew Bible or the Christian Old Testament, and in the Greek New Testament the term archangel only occurs in 1 Thessalonians 4 (1 Thessalonians 4:16) and the Epistle of Jude (Jude 1:9), where it is used of Michael, who in Daniel 10 (Daniel 10:12) is called 'one of the chief princes,' and 'the great prince'. In the Septuagint, this is rendered "the great angel."

The idea of seven archangels is most explicitly stated in the deuterocanonical/apocryphal Book of Tobit when Raphael reveals himself, declaring: "I am Raphael, one of the seven angels who stand in the glorious presence of the Lord, ready to serve him." (Tobit 12,15) The other two angels mentioned by name in the Bibles used by Catholics and Protestants are the archangel Michael and the angel Gabriel; Uriel is named in 2 Esdras (4:1 and 5:20) and Jerahmeel is named in 2 Esdras 4:36, a book that is regarded as canonical by the Ethiopian Orthodox Church, the Georgian and Russian Orthodox Churches, and falls within the Apocrypha section of the Protestant Bible used by Lutherans and Anglicans. The names of other archangels come from tradition.

Zechariah 4,10 tells about "seven rejoices" that are "the eyes of the Lord, Which scan to and from throughout the whole earth." Revelation 8 (Revelation 8:2) mentions seven angels (Ancient Greek: ἀγγέλους) who "stand before God, and to them were given seven trumpets." Similarly, Revelation 16 (Revelation 16:1) indicates: "and I heard a loud voice from the temple saying to the seven angels (Ancient Greek: ἑπτὰ ἀγγέλοις): Go and pour out the seven bowls of the wrath of God into the earth." Lastly, Revelation 4 and Revelation 5 (Revelation 4:5) mention "seven Spirits" (Ancient Greek: τα ἑπτά Πνεύματα, transliterated into "ta hepta Pneumata") – whose identity is not well specified – who are the "seven lamps of fire [that] were burning before the throne".

== Biblical apocrypha ==
One such tradition of archangels comes from the Old Testament biblical apocrypha, the third century BC Book of the Watchers, known as 1 Enoch or the Book of Enoch, eventually merged into the Enochic Pentateuch. This narrative is affiliated with the Book of Giants, which also references the great archangels and was made part of the Ethiopian Orthodox Tewahedo Church's scriptural canon. Although prevalent in Jewish and early Christian apostolic traditions and the early Church Fathers, the Book of Enoch gradually fell from academic and religious status, and by the seventh century was rejected from the canonical scriptures of all other Christian denominations.

The names of the archangels entered Jewish tradition during the Babylonian captivity (605 BC). Babylonian folklore and cosmology, and early Mesopotamian beliefs under the dualistic influence of Zoroastrianism, centered around anthropomorphic and zoomorphic representations of stars, planets, and constellations, including the four sons of the Sky Father carrying the Winged Sun, the throne of Wisdom. First the prophet Daniel, then authors such as Ezekiel hebraized this mythology, equating the Babylonian constellations with abstract forms held to be "sons of the gods", angels of the Lord of Israel, and heavenly animal cherubim. The 2 BC Book of Parables (Ch XL) names the four angels accompanying the Ancient of Days, standing before the Lord of Spirits, "the voices of those upon the four sides magnifying the Lord of Glory": Michael, Raphael, Gabriel, and Phanuel.

The Book of the Watchers (Ch IX) lists the angels who in antediluvian times interceded on behalf of mankind against the rogue spirits termed "the Watchers": Michael, Gabriel, Raphael, and Uriel.

== Christian traditions ==
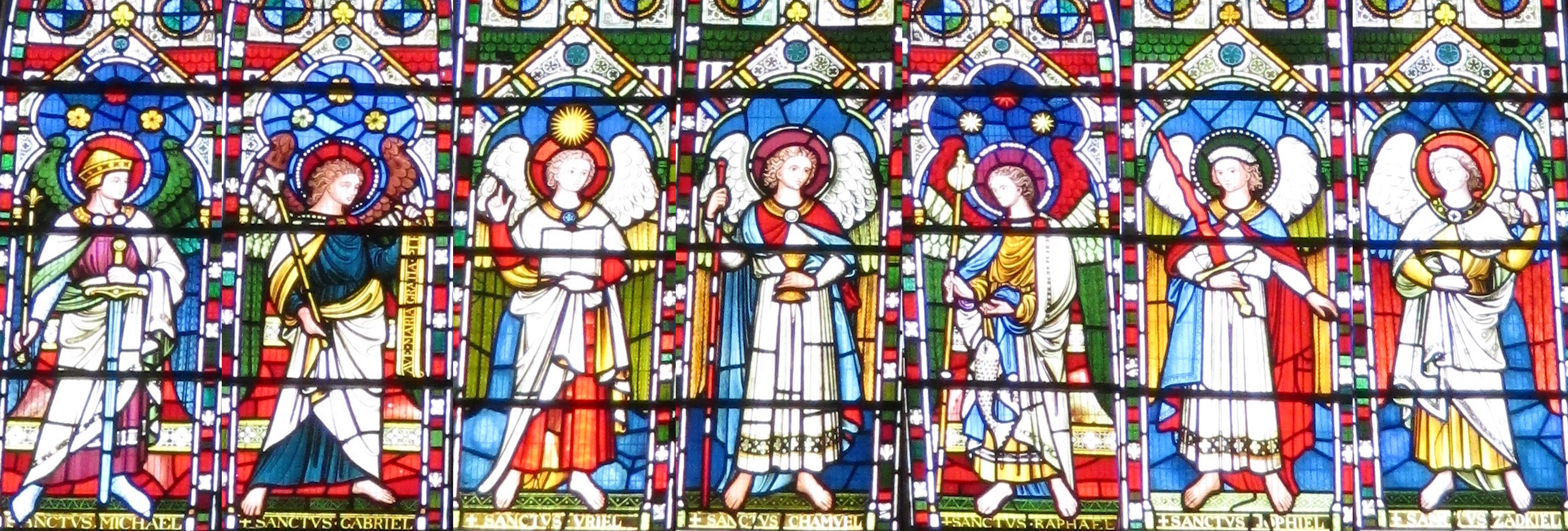
Seven Archangels depicted in the stained glass window at St Michael's Church, Brighton. From left: Michael, Gabriel, Uriel, Chamuel (Camael), Raphael, Jophiel, and Zadkiel.

The earliest specific Christian references are in the late 5th to early 6th century. In Western Christian traditions, Michael, Gabriel and Raphael are referred to as archangels. Through its Byzantine tradition, however, the Catholic Church recognizes seven archangels altogether, sometimes named, sometimes unnamed other than the three mentioned above.

Lists of archangels also exist in smaller religious traditions usually regarded within mainstream Christianity as occultist or superstitious. A reference to seven archangels appeared in an 8th- or 9th-century talisman attributed to Auriolus, a "servant of God" in north-western Spain. He issues a prayer to "all you patriarchs Michael, Gabriel, Cecitiel, Uriel, Raphael, Ananiel, Marmoniel.

=== Archangels in current church traditions ===
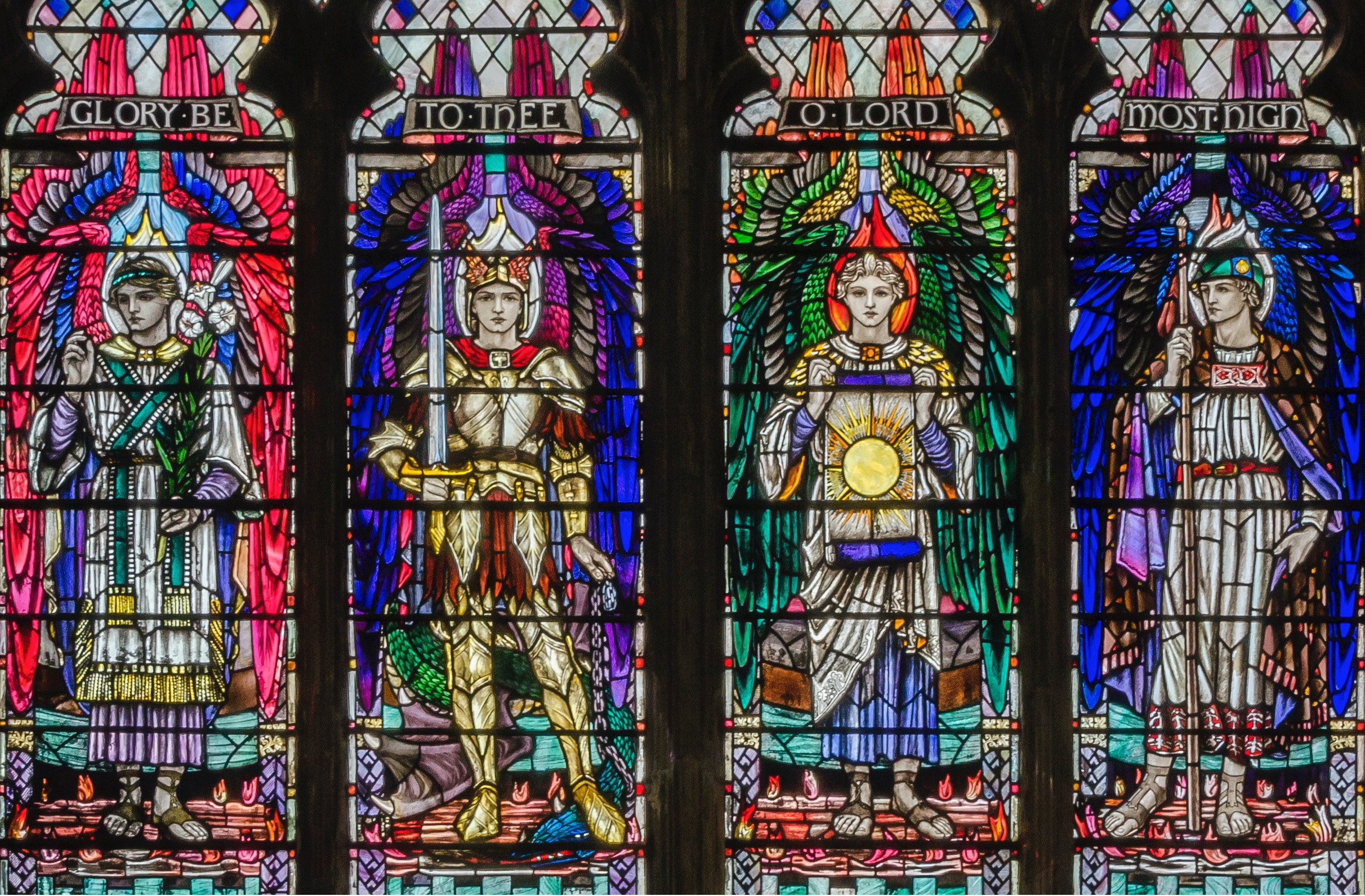
The four archangels in Anglican tradition, from left to right: Gabriel, Michael, Uriel, and Raphael. Stained glass window at Hull Minster.

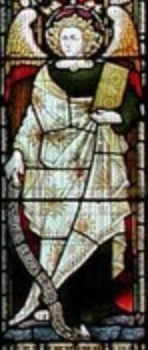
The Archangel Jeremiel holding a book, depicted in a stained-glass window at St Michael and All Angels Anglican Church, Hughenden

In the Catholic Church, three archangels are mentioned by name in its Biblical canon: Michael, Gabriel, and Raphael. Raphael appears in the deuterocanonical Book of Tobit, where he is described as "one of the seven angels who stand ready and enter before the glory of the lord of spirits", a phrase recalled in Revelation 8:2–6. Three Popes rejected to authorize veneration of the purported names of the Seven Archangels within the Roman Catholic Church: Pope Leo XII (1826–1828), Pope Pius VIII (1830) and Pope Gregory XVI (1831–1832). The Directory on popular piety and the Liturgy (2001) at n. 217 states that "the practice of assigning names to the Holy Angels should be discouraged, except in the case of Gabriel, Raphael and Michael whose names are contained in Holy Scripture."

Some Eastern Orthodox Churches, exemplified in the Orthodox Slavonic Bible (Ostrog Bible, Elizabeth Bible, and later consequently Russian Synodal Bible), recognize as authoritative also 2 Esdras, which mentions Uriel and Jerahmeel.

The Eastern Orthodox Church and Eastern Catholic Churches of the Byzantine tradition venerate seven to eight archangels. Michael, Gabriel, Raphael, Uriel, Selaphiel (Salathiel), Jegudiel (Jehudiel), Barachiel, and the eighth, Jerahmeel (Jeremiel) (The Synaxis of the Chief of the Heavenly Hosts, Archangel Michael and the Other Heavenly Bodiless Powers: Feast Day: November 8).

As well as Michael, Gabriel, Raphael and Uriel, the Book of Enoch, regarded as canonical by the Ethiopian Orthodox Tewahedo Church, mentions (in chapter 20) Raguel, Saraqâêl, and Remiel; however, apocryphal sources give instead the names Izidkiel, Hanael, and Kepharel. Within the Oriental Orthodox Christian denominations, the Ethiopian Orthodox tradition names seven Archangels as Michael, Gabriel, Raphael, Uriel, Raguel, Phanuel, and Remiel; in the Coptic Orthodox tradition the seven to eight archangels are named as Michael, Gabriel, Raphael, Suriel, Zadkiel, Sarathiel, and Ananiel, as well as often Sakakael.

In the Lutheran and Anglican traditions there are three archangels celebrated in September 29, the feast of St Michael and All Angels (also called Michaelmas), namely Michael, Gabriel, and Raphael. Uriel is not officially recognized or named in Anglican doctrine, though some still include him; one Episcopal church, St. Uriel’s Episcopal Church, bears his name.

== Other traditions ==
Other names derived from pseudepigrapha are Selaphiel, Jegudiel, and Raguel.

In Ismailism, there are seven cherubim, comparable to the Seven Archangels ordered to bow down before Qadar, of whom Iblis refuses.

In Yezidism, there are seven archangels, named Jabra'il, Mika'il, Rafa'il (Israfil), Dadra'il, Azrail, Shamkil (Shemna'il), and Azazil, who are emanations from God entrusted with care of the creation.

Various occult systems associate each archangel with one of the traditional "seven luminaries" (classical planets visible to the naked eye): the Sun, the Moon, Mercury, Venus, Mars, Jupiter, and Saturn. Different traditions associate different archangels to each planet.

According to Rudolf Steiner, four archangels govern the seasons: spring is Raphael, summer is Uriel, autumn is Michael, and winter is Gabriel.

According to occultist Helena Petrovna Blavatsky, the Seven Archangels were a form of syncretism between different religions: they were the Chaldeans great gods, the Seven Sabian Gods, the seven Hinduist Manus and Seven Rashi, as well as the Seven Seats (Thrones) and Virtues of the Kabbalists.

In the early Gnostic text On the Origin of the World, the aeon named Sophia sends seven archangels to rescue the Archon Sabaoth and bring him to the eighth heaven.

== See also ==
- List of angels in theology
