= November 8 (Eastern Orthodox liturgics) =

Day in the Eastern Orthodox liturgical calendar

Eastern Orthodox liturgical calendar
November 7	November 8	November 9
November 8 O.S. ≍ November 21 N.S. November 8 N.S ≍ October 26 O.S.

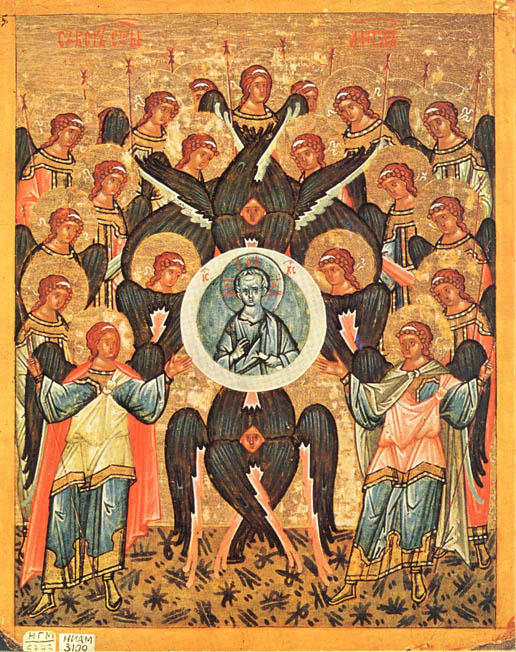
Synaxis of the Holy Archangel Michael and the Other Bodiless Powers.

November 8 in Eastern Orthodox liturgical calendars is a feast day and a day of commemoration of saints and martyrs. Although some Orthodox churches use the Revised Julian Calendar and others use the traditional Julian calendar, the fixed commemorations for their respective November 8 are broadly the same, no matter which calendar is used. (Note: Despite the dates being the same, the days to which they refer typically differ by 13 days. The notation Old Style or O.S. is sometimes used to indicate a date in the traditional Julian Calendar (the "Old Calendar"). The notation New Style or N.S. indicates a date in the Revised Julian calendar (the "New Calendar").)

== Saints ==
- Synaxis of the Holy Archangels Michael, Gabriel, Raphael, Uriel, Salaphiel, Jegudiel, Barachiel, Jeremiel and the Other Bodiless Powers. (Note: Name days celebrated today include: Michael (Μιχάλης); Michaela (Μιχαηλία); Angelo (Ἄγγελος); Angela (Ἀγγελική); Gabriel (Γαβριήλ); Gabriella (Γαβριέλλα); Stamatis (Σταμάτης); Stamatia (Σταματία) – the meaning of this name is taken from the Anaphora prayed during the Divine Liturgy: "Let Us Stand Aright, Let Us Stand With Fear!"; Taxiarchis (Ταξιάρχης).) (Note: See also: January 11 - Synaxis of the Myriad of Holy Angels (Synaxis of the Myriangelon). In the West, Michaelmas is celebrated on September 29.)

== Pre-Schism Western saints ==
- The Four Crowned Martyrs (c. 305): (Note: There are two groups called the Four Holy Crowned Martyrs: One group suffered in Albano in Italy in c 305, Secundus, Severian, Carpophorus and Victorinus.; The other group, actually five in number, were martyred in Pannonia at about the same time: Claudius, Nicostratus, Symphorian and Castorius and Simplicius. The latter were sculptors who refused to carve a statue of the god Aesculapius and were martyred by Diocletian. Relics of four of the martyrs were brought to Rome and so veneration of four, not five, began.) (Note: "At Rome, on the Lavican road, three miles from the city, the martyrdom of the Saints Claudius, Nicostratus, Symphorian, Castorius and Simplicius, who were first sent to prison, then scourged with whips set with metal, and as they could not be made to forsake the faith of Christ, Diocletian ordered them to be thrown into the river. – Also, on the Lavican way, the birthday of the saintly brothers, Severus, Severian, Carpophorus and Victorinus, called the Four Crowned, who were scourged to death with leaded whips, during the reign of the same emperor. As their names, known some years afterwards by revelation, could not then be ascertained, it was ordered that their anniversary should be commemorated with the preceding five, under the name of the Four Saints Crowned. This appellation was retained by the Church, even after their names had been revealed.")

- Secundus, Severian, Carpophorus and Victorinus; or:
- Claudius, Nicostratus, Symphorian, Castorius and Simplicius.

- Saint Maurus, second Bishop of Verdun, Confessor (383)
- Saint Clarus of Marmoutier, a monk at the monastery of Marmoutier with St Martin; he was ordained priest and then lived as a hermit near the monastery (389) (Note: "At Tours, St. Clarus, priest, whose epitaph was written by St. Paulinus.")
- Saint Cybi (Cuby), Cornish bishop and, briefly king, who worked largely in North Wales (6th century) (Note: An abbot who, with St Seiroil, is one of the most famous saints of Anglesey. He founded a monastery there, called Caer Gybi (the fortress of Cybi). He is the patron saint of Llangibby and Llangybi in Wales and Tregony, Landulph and Cuby in Cornwall.) (Note: Rev. Richard Stanton lists "St. Kybi, or Kebius" on November 6, as follows: "ST. KYBI was the son of Saloman, King of Brittany, and member of a family which produced several Saints in the Church of God. Kybi early in life devoted himself to the ecclesiastical state, and is said to have been consecrated Bishop by St. Hilary of Arles; but he fled from the honours due to him in his own country, and visited Great Britain and Ireland. Finally he settled himself in Anglesey, and became the Apostle of that island, where he ended his days in peace.") (see also: November 5)
- Saint Deusdedit (Adeodatus I), Pope of Rome (618) (Note: Born in Rome, he became Pope in 615. During an outbreak of the plague he worked untiringly for the sick.) (Note: "At Rome, St. Deusdedit, pope, whose merit was so great that he cured a leper by kissing him.")
- Saint Tysilio (Tyssel, Tyssilo, Suliau), Prince of Powys, Abbot of Meifod, Wales (7th century) (Note: A prince who became Abbot of Meifod in Powys and founded several churches in other parts of Wales.)
- Saint Willehad, Bishop of Bremen, Confessor (789) (Note: A Northumbrian monk who in c 766 left England to enlighten the Frisians in the Netherlands. Later he preached to the Saxons, but had to abandon this mission and retired to the monastery of Echternach. In 787 he was ordained Bishop of Bremen in Germany.) (Note: "At Bremen, the deposition of ST. WlLLIHAD, the first Bishop of that See, and Confessor.") (Note: "At Bremen, St. Willehad, first bishop of that city, who, in conjunction with St. Boniface, whose disciple he was, spread the Gospel in Friesland and Saxony.")
- Saint Wiomad (Weomadus, Wermad), a monk at St Maximinus in Trier in Germany, he became Abbot of Mettlach and finally Bishop of Trier (790)
- Saint Moroc, Abbot of Dunkeld and afterwards Bishop of Dunblane in Scotland (9th century)
- Saint Gregory of Einsiedeln, Abbot of Einsiedeln Abbey (c. 945 or 996) (Note: On pilgrimage from England to Rome, he became a monk. On his way home he stopped at the monastery of Einsiedeln in Switzerland in 949. Eventually he became abbot there and the monastery flourished under him.) (Note: Stanton lists him on November 13, as follows: "GREGORY was an Englishman, and according to the tradition a son of King Edward the Elder, or at least of the royal family. Called to quit the world by a heavenly vision, he left his country, his parents, and his spouse, or his betrothed bride, and betook himself to the holy city of Rome, where he entered St. Gregory's Monastery on the Celian. After some time spent in retirement and great holiness of life, he silently withdrew to St. Meinrad's Abbey of Our Lady of the Hermits in Switzerland. In that solitude Gregory lived ten years under the rule of the Abbot Eberhard, and on his death succeeded him in the government of the community. In the discharge of these duties he persevered, as a faithful steward, till his holy death. Though we do not find the name of Gregory in any Calendar of the Saints, we are told that his life "was most abundantly adorned with virtues," and the Emperor Otho the Great, in a diploma, speaks of him as "a most holy man, and mighty in all virtues"."; "Mabillon derives his notice of Gregory from the contemporary writer of the life of St. Wolfgang, who calls him "ex stirpe Anglorum," without mentioning his royal birth. Trithemius is the first to record this, and Mabillon seems to discredit the story, or at least says he cannot have been the son of Edward. Lappenberg, however, sees no difficulty in the tradition. If the account be accepted, Otho would be his brother-in-law. It is possible that the name Gregory was assumed, to conceal his origin, when he entered the religious state.")
- Saint Gervadius (Gernard, Garnet), born in Ireland, he went to Moray and became a hermit near Elgin in Scotland (10th century)

== Post-Schism Orthodox saints ==
- Righteous Maria (Martha in monasticism), Princess of Pskov (1300)

=== New martyrs and confessors ===
- New Martyr Michael the Blessed, of Chernigov (1922)
- New Hieromartyr Paul Ansimov, Priest (1937) (Note: See: (in Russian) Ансимов, Павел Георгиевич. Википедии. (Russian Wikipedia).) (see also: November 9)
- New Hieromartyr Alexis (Zadvornov), Hieromonk of Yaroslavl-Rostov (1937) (see also: November 9)

== Icons ==
* Synaxis of the Archangel Michael "Mantamados" ("Taxiarches Michael"), on Lesbos. (Note: There is only one 'icon' in Orthodox church tradition that defies the traditional structure of iconography. This is the "Mantamados icon" in Mytilene, Lesvos. The Archangel's upper-torso is represented as a raised relief image, composed of the mixture of dirt together with the blood of the martyred monks.)
* Synaxis of the Archangel Michael "Panormitis", on Symi.

== Other commemorations ==
- Repose of Nun Barbara of Birsk (1903)
- Repose of Elder Photius of Valaam Monastery (1942)
- Repose of Blessed Olga Michael of Alaska, Matushka (1979) (see also: October 27 - feast day)
- Repose of Metropolitan Philaret Voznesensky of New York (1985) (see also: November 21)
- Repose of Elder Iakovos (Tsalikis), of the Holy Monastery of Venerable David, in Euboea (1991). (Note: Elder Iakovos (Tsalikis) of Euboea reposed on November 21, 1991. He was formally glorified as a saint on November 27, 2017 by the Sacred and Holy Synod of the Ecumenical Patriarchate, following the approval and recommendation of the Church of Greece. The feast day of Venerable Iakovos of Euboea The New Ascetic was set on November 22 each year. His glorification was liturgically celebrated on Sunday June 3, 2018, at St. David Monastery, headed by His All-Holiness Ecumenical Patriarch Bartholomew, with the concelebration of 30 Orthodox bishops from the Greek and Cypriot Orthodox Churches and the Ecumenical Patriarchate.)
- Repose of Priest George Calciu of Romania and Alexandria, Virginia (2006).

== Icon gallery ==
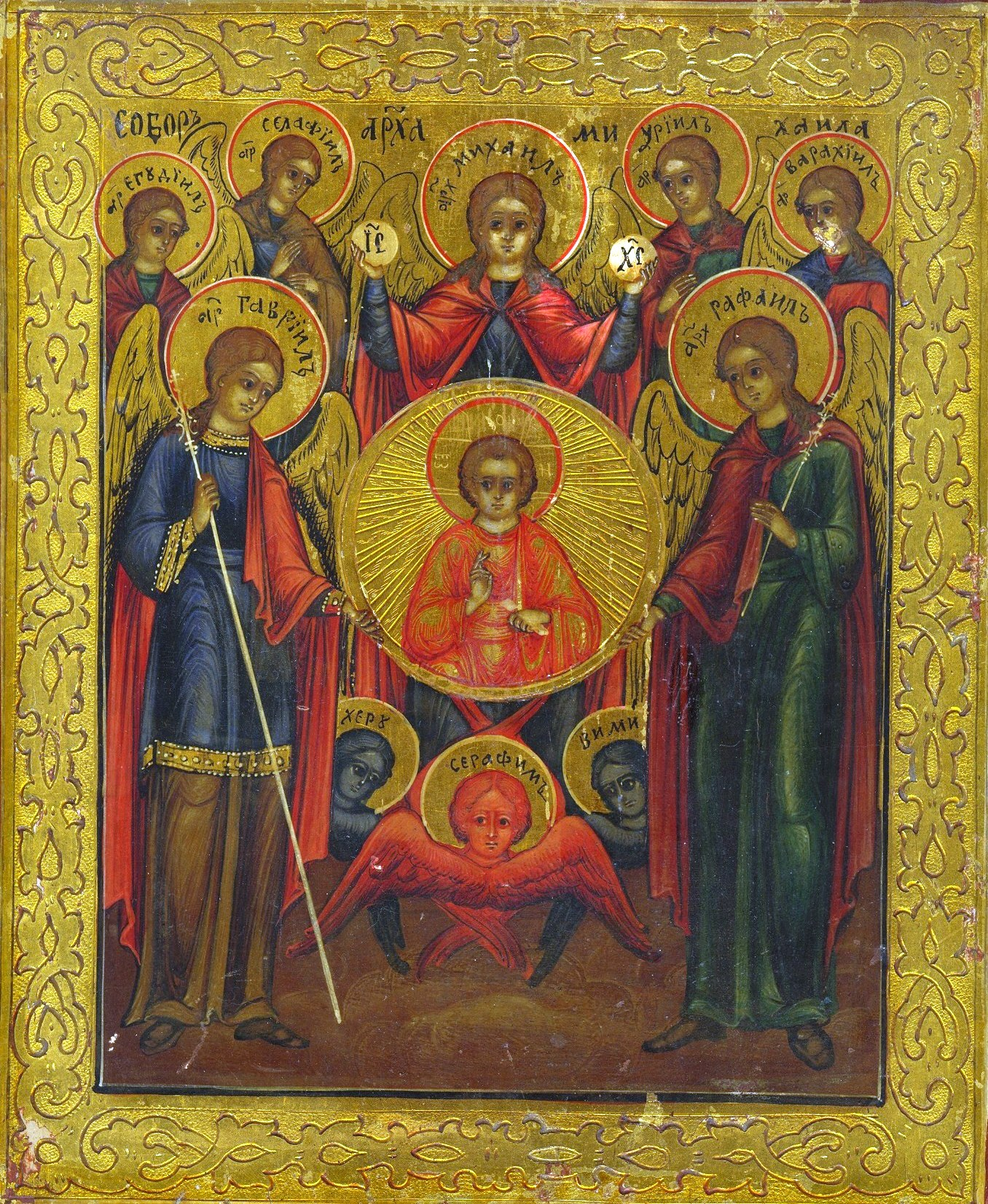
Synaxis of the Holy Archangel Michael and the Other Bodiless Powers.

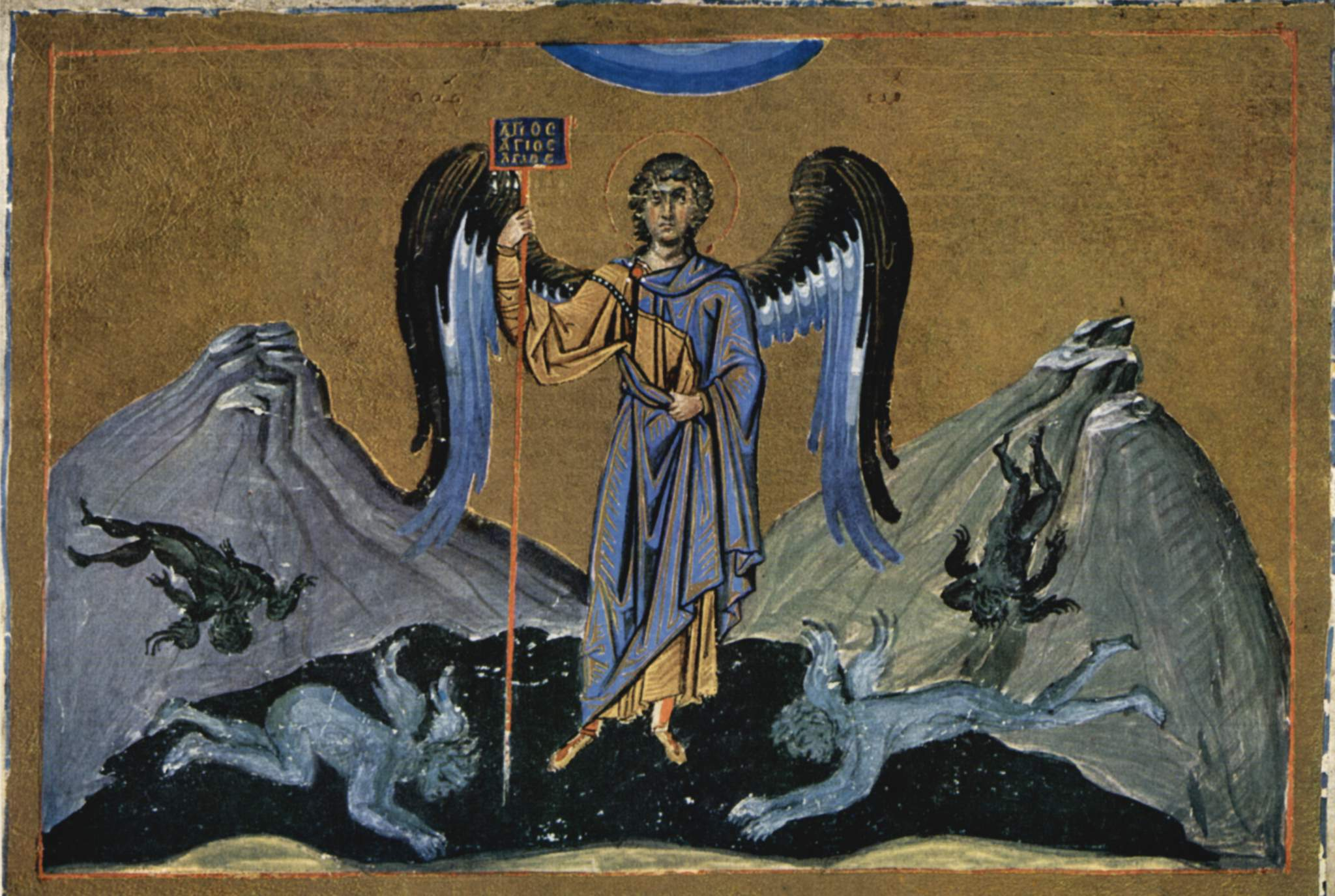
Synaxis of the Holy Archangel Michael.
The standard depicts the biblical 'thrice holy' of Isaiah 6:3 — Holy, holy, holy, Lord of Sabaoth.
(Menologion of Basil II, 10th century).

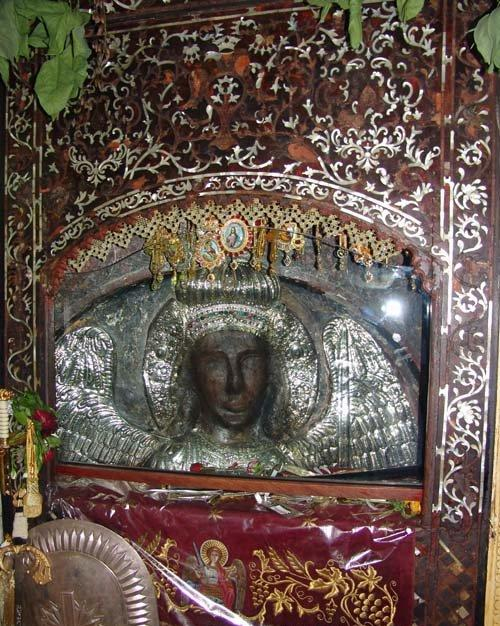
Icon of the Archangel Michael "Mantamados" ("Taxiarches Michael"), on Lesbos.

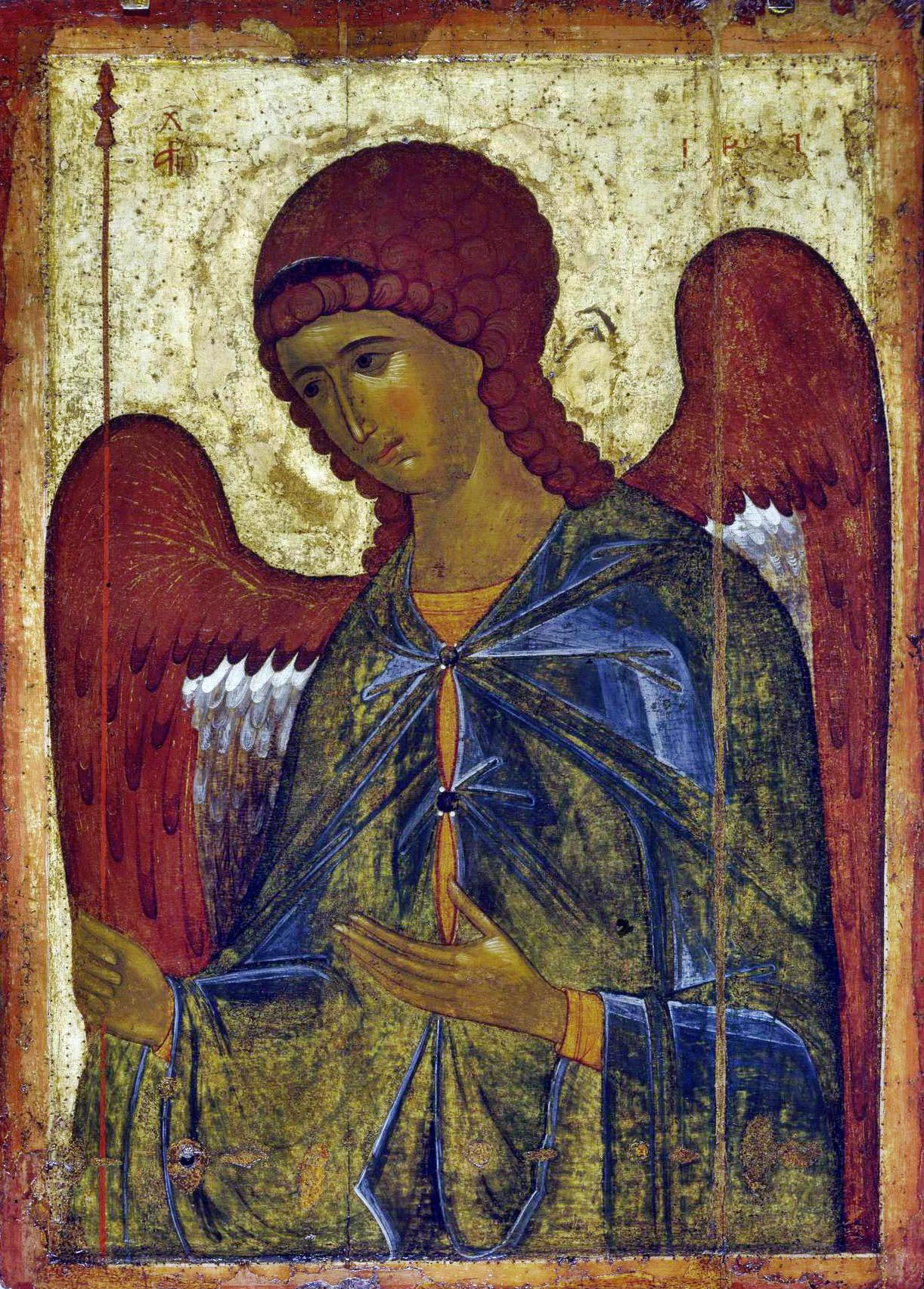
Archangel Gabriel.

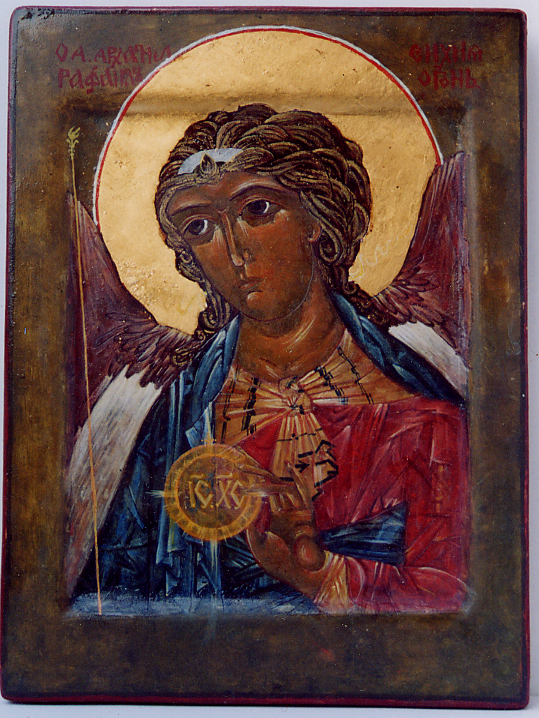
Archangel Raphael.

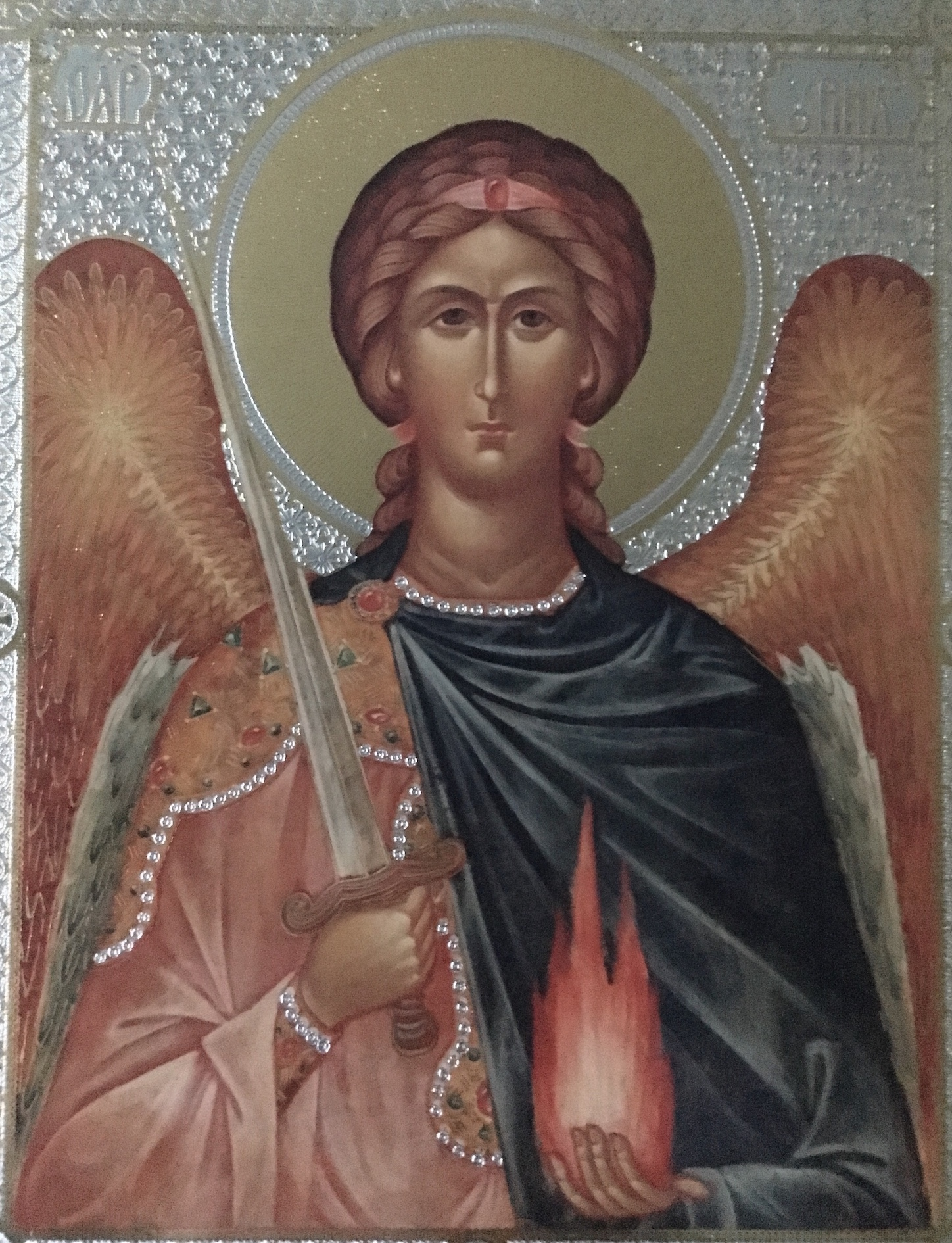
Archangel Uriel.

Archangel Salaphiel.

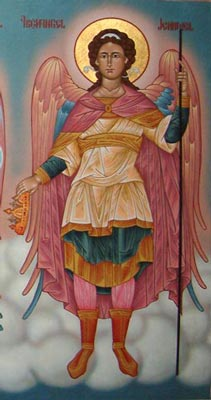
Archangel Jegudiel.

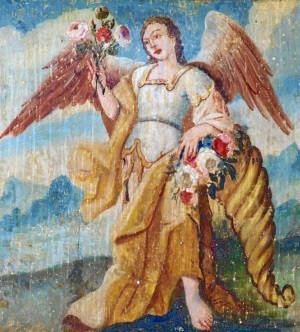
Archangel Barachiel.

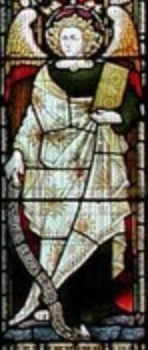
Archangel Jeremiel.

== Sources ==
- November 8/November 21. Orthodox Calendar (PRAVOSLAVIE.RU).
- November 21 / November 8. HOLY TRINITY RUSSIAN ORTHODOX CHURCH (A parish of the Patriarchate of Moscow).
- November 8. OCA - The Lives of the Saints.
- The Autonomous Orthodox Metropolia of Western Europe and the Americas (ROCOR). St. Hilarion Calendar of Saints for the year of our Lord 2004. St. Hilarion Press (Austin, TX). pp. 83–84.
- The Eighth Day of the Month of November. Orthodoxy in China.
- November 8. Latin Saints of the Orthodox Patriarchate of Rome.
- The Roman Martyrology. Transl. by the Archbishop of Baltimore. Last Edition, According to the Copy Printed at Rome in 1914. Revised Edition, with the Imprimatur of His Eminence Cardinal Gibbons. Baltimore: John Murphy Company, 1916. pp. 344–345.
- Rev. Richard Stanton. A Menology of England and Wales, or, Brief Memorials of the Ancient British and English Saints Arranged According to the Calendar, Together with the Martyrs of the 16th and 17th Centuries. London: Burns & Oates, 1892. pp. 531–532.

Greek Sources

- Great Synaxaristes: (in Greek) 8 ΝΟΕΜΒΡΙΟΥ. ΜΕΓΑΣ ΣΥΝΑΞΑΡΙΣΤΗΣ.
- (in Greek) Συναξαριστής. 8 Νοεμβρίου. ECCLESIA.GR. (H ΕΚΚΛΗΣΙΑ ΤΗΣ ΕΛΛΑΔΟΣ).
- (in Greek) 08/11/2016. Ορθόδοξος Συναξαριστής.

Russian Sources

- (in Russian) 21 ноября (8 ноября). Православная Энциклопедия под редакцией Патриарха Московского и всея Руси Кирилла (электронная версия). (Orthodox Encyclopedia - Pravenc.ru).
- (in Russian) 8 ноября по старому стилю / 21 ноября по новому стилю. Русская Православная Церковь - Православный церковный календарь на 2016 год.
