= Archangel =

Second-lowest rank of angel

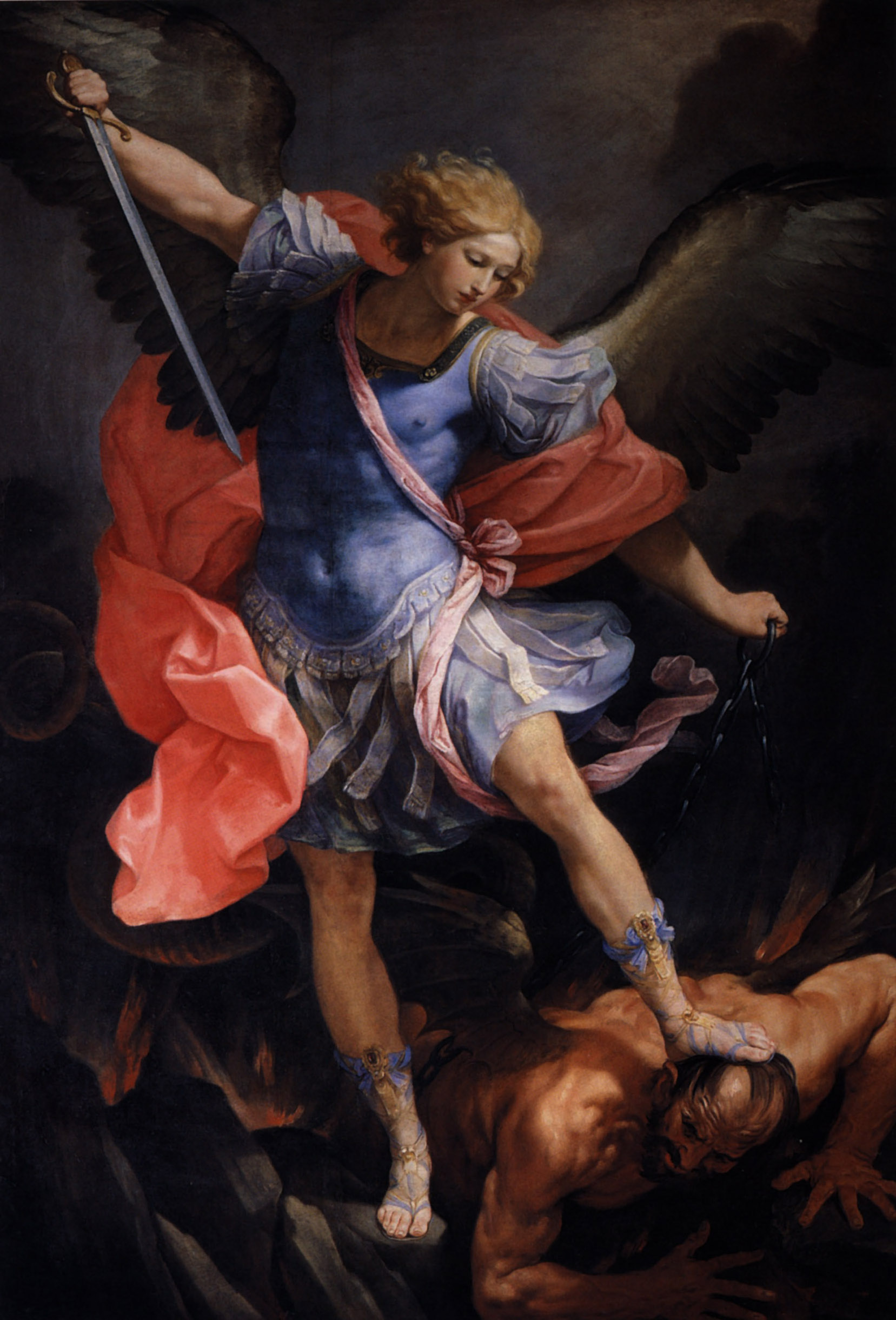
Guido Reni's Archangel Michael Trampling Lucifer, 1636

Archangels (/ˌɑːrkˈeɪndʒəls/) are the second-lowest rank of angel in the hierarchy of angels, based on and put forward by Pseudo-Dionysius the Areopagite in the 5th or 6th century in his book De Coelesti Hierarchia (On the Celestial Hierarchy).

The Bible uses the term "archangel" two times referring to the angel Michael only in the New Testament. The Bible does not mention a particular hierarchy of angels in any detail aside from this. The word is usually associated with the Abrahamic religions and many offshoots with which they are historically associated.

Archangel is derived from Greek archángelos (ἀρχάγγελος), with the Greek prefix arch- meaning 'chief'. In Catholic theology, archangels constitute the second-lowest rank of angel; much of modernized imaging of Archangels as we have today likely stems from the etymology of their name, as well as their presentation in John Milton's Paradise Lost.

In many offshoots of Judaism, with the oldest text coming from Enoch 1, the highest ranking angels such as Michael, Raphael, Gabriel and Uriel, who are usually referred to as archangels in English, are given the title of śārīm (Hebrew: שָׂרִים 'princes'; sing. שָׂר śār), to show their superior rank and status. Two examples of this can be seen in Daniel 10:13 and 12:1, where Michael, Chief of the Heavenly Host, is referred to as ʾaḥaḏ haśśārīm hārišōnīm (אַחַד הַשָּׂרִים הָרִאשֹׁנִים 'one of the chief princes') in the former, and haśśar haggāḏōl (הַשַּׂר הַגָּדוֹל 'the great prince') in the latter.

== Description ==
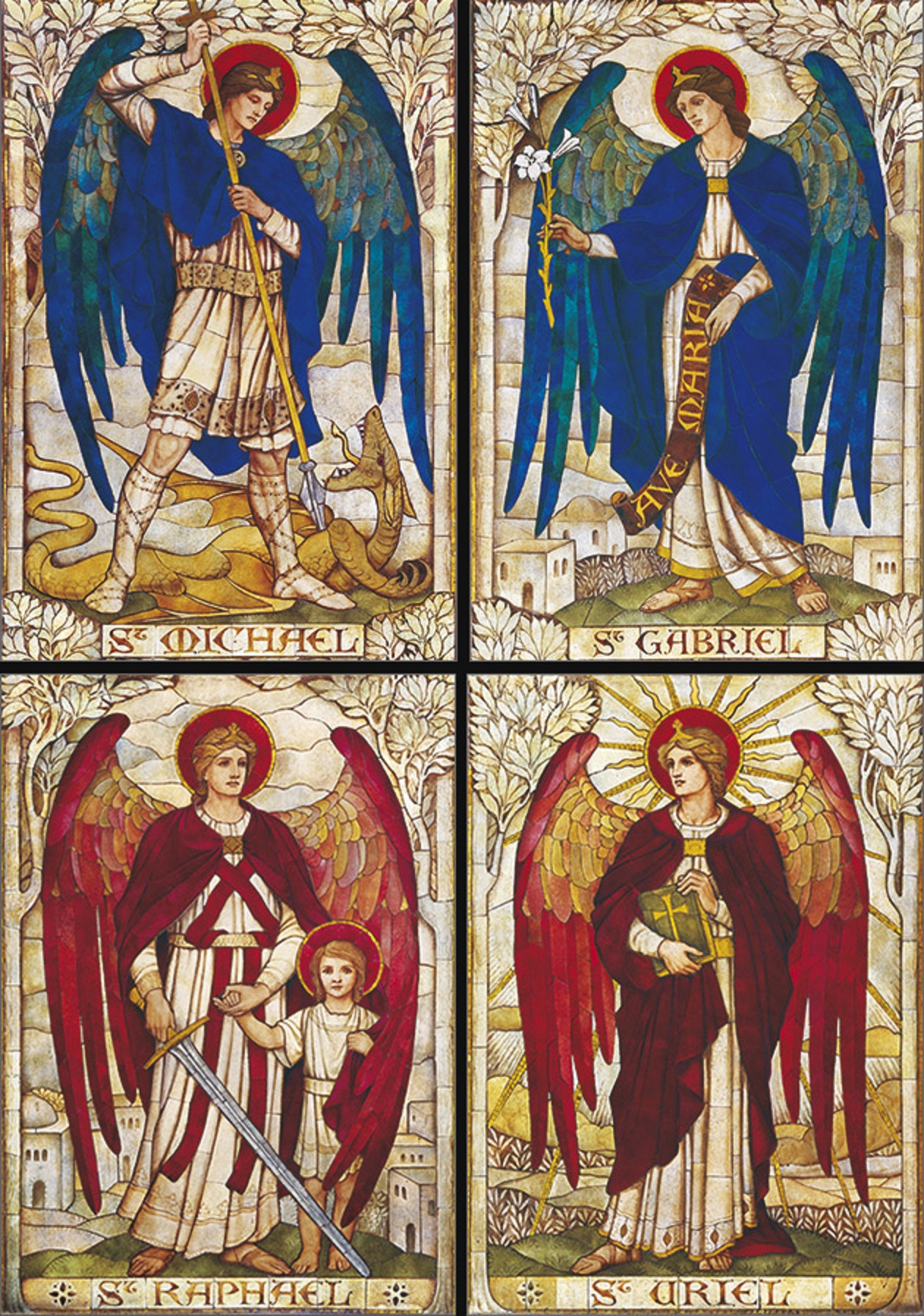
The four archangels, mosaics at St John's Church, Warminster

Michael and Gabriel are recognized as archangels in Judaism and Islam, and by most Christians. Raphael—mentioned in the deuterocanonical/apocryphal Book of Tobit— is also recognized as a chief angel in the Catholic, Lutheran, Anglican and Eastern Orthodox churches. (Note: The Book of Tobit is considered to be part of the Old Testament in the Catholic, Oriental Orthodox, Eastern Orthodox, and Persian Churches; in the Catholic Church, it is deemed one of the deuterocanonical books. In traditional Protestantism, such as the Lutheran Churches, Anglican Churches and Anabaptist Churches, the Book of Tobit is an intertestamental book, being a part of the Apocrypha.) Gabriel, Michael, and Raphael are venerated in the Roman Catholic Church and Lutheran churches with a feast on September 29 (between 1921 and 1969, March 24 for Gabriel and October 24 for Raphael), and in the Eastern Orthodox Church on November 8 (if the Julian calendar is used, this corresponds to November 21 in the Gregorian). The named archangels in Islam are Jibra'il, Mika'il, Israfil, and Malak Al-Mawt (Angel of death). Jewish literature, such as the Sefer Hekhalot (3 Enoch), also mentions Metatron as an archangel, called the "highest of the angels", though the acceptance of this angel is not canonical in all branches of the faith.

Some branches of the faiths mentioned have identified a group of seven to eight archangels, but the named angels vary, depending on the source. Gabriel, Michael, and Raphael are always mentioned; the other archangels vary, but most commonly include Uriel and Jerahmeel, both of whom are mentioned in 2 Esdras. (Note: 2 Esdras is considered to be part of the Old Testament canon in the Ethiopian Orthodox Tewahedo Church, while in traditional Protestantism, such as the Lutheran Churches, Anglican Churches and Anabaptist Churches, 2 Esdras is an intertestamental book, being a part of the Apocrypha.) As well as Michael, Gabriel, Raphael and Uriel, the Book of Enoch, regarded as canonical by the Ethiopian Orthodox Tewahedo Church (Oriental Orthodox), mentions in chapter 20: Raguel, Sariel, and Jerahmeel (Remiel).

== Zoroastrianism ==
An increasing number of experts in anthropology, theology and philosophy believe that Zoroastrianism contains the earliest distillation of prehistoric belief in angels.

The Amesha Spentas (Avestan: Aməša Spəṇta, meaning "beneficent immortals") of Zoroastrianism are likened to archangels. They individually inhabit immortal bodies that operate in the physical world to protect, guide, and inspire humanity and the spirit world. The Avesta explains the origin and nature of archangels or Amesha Spentas.

To maintain equilibrium, Ahura Mazda engaged in the first act of creation, distinguishing his Holy Spirit Spenta Mainyu, the Archangel of righteousness. Ahura Mazda also distinguished from himself six more Amesha Spentas, who, along with Spenta Mainyu, aided in the creation of the physical universe. Then he oversaw the development of sixteen lands, each imbued with a unique cultural catalyst calculated to encourage the formation of distinct human populations. The Amesha Spentas were charged with protecting these holy lands and through their emanation, also believed to align each respective population in service to God.

The Amesha Spentas as attributes of God are:

1. Spenta Mainyu (Pahlavi: Spenamino): lit. "Bountiful Spirit"
2. Asha Vahishta (Phl. Ardwahisht): lit. "Highest Truth"
3. Vohu Mano (Phl. Vohuman): lit. "Righteous Mind"
4. Khshathra Vairya (Phl. Shahrewar): lit. "Desirable Dominion"
5. Spenta Armaiti (Phl. Spandarmad): lit. "Holy Devotion"
6. Haurvatat (Phl. Hordad): lit. "Perfection or Health"
7. Ameretat (Phl. Amurdad): lit. "Immortality"

== Judaism ==
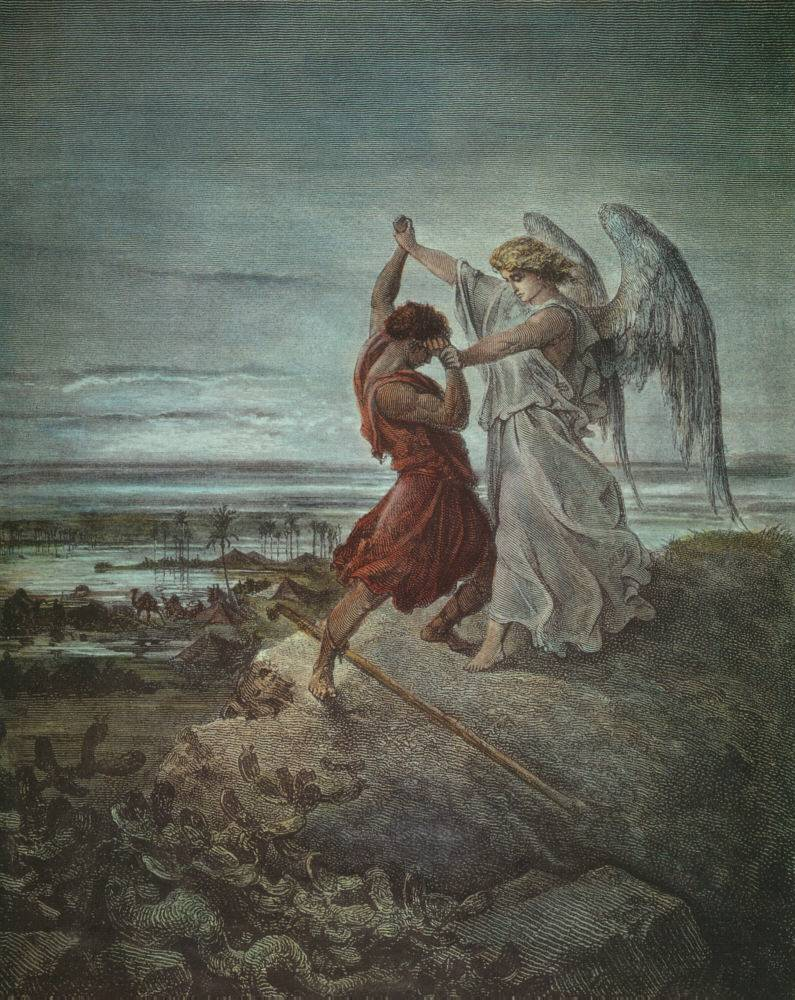
Jacob Wrestling with the Angel by Gustave Doré, 1885

The Hebrew Bible uses the term מלאכי אלהים (malakhey Elohim; Angels of God), The Hebrew word for angel is "malakh", which means messenger, for the angels מלאכי יי (malakhey Adonai; Angels of the Lord) are God's messengers to perform various missions – e.g. 'angel of death'; בני אלהים (b'nei elohim; sons of God) and הקדושים (ha-q'doshim; the holy ones) to refer to beings traditionally interpreted as angelic messengers. Other terms are used in later texts, such as העליונים (ha-elyonim, the upper ones, or the supreme ones). References to angels are uncommon in Jewish literature except in later works such as the Book of Daniel, though they are mentioned briefly in the stories of Jacob (who according to one interpretation wrestled with an angel) and Lot (who was warned by angels of the impending destruction of the cities of Sodom and Gomorrah). Daniel is the first biblical figure to refer to individual angels by name. It is therefore widely speculated that Jewish interest in angels developed during the Babylonian captivity. According to Rabbi Simeon ben Lakish of Tiberias (230–270 A.D.), specific names for the angels were brought back by the Jews from Babylon.

There are no explicit references to archangels in the canonical texts of the Hebrew Bible. In post-Biblical Judaism, certain angels came to take on a particular significance and developed unique personalities and roles. Though these archangels were believed to have ranked amongst the heavenly host, no systematic hierarchy ever developed. Metatron is considered one of the highest of the angels in Merkavah and Kabbalist mysticism and often serves as a scribe. He is briefly mentioned in the Talmud, and figures prominently in Merkavah mystical texts. Michael, who serves as a warrior and advocate for Israel, is looked upon particularly fondly. Gabriel is mentioned in the Book of Daniel and briefly in the Talmud, as well as many Merkavah mystical texts. The earliest references to archangels are in the literature of the intertestamental periods (e.g., 4 Esdras 4:36).

In the Kabbalah there are traditionally twelve archangels, who are each assigned to a certain sephira: Shubael, Raziel, Cassiel, Zadkiel, Camael, Michael, Uriel & Haniel, Raphael & Jophiel, Gabriel, and Azrael. There are also a variety of other archangels who share similar associations spanning throughout this tradition. Chapter 20 of the Book of Enoch mentions seven holy angels who watch, that often are considered the seven archangels: Michael, Raphael, Gabriel, Uriel, Sariel, Raguel, and Remiel. The Life of Adam and Eve lists the archangels as well: Michael, Gabriel, Uriel, Raphael and Joel. Medieval Jewish philosopher Maimonides made a Jewish angelic hierarchy.

== Christianity ==
The New Testament makes over a hundred references to angels, but uses the word "archangel" only twice, in 1 Thessalonians 4:16 ("For the Lord himself shall descend from heaven with a shout, with the voice of the archangel, and with the trumpet of God: and the dead in Christ shall rise first", KJV) and Jude 1:9 ("Yet Michael the archangel, when contending with the devil he disputed about the body of Moses, durst not bring against him a railing accusation, but said, The Lord rebuke thee", KJV).

=== Catholic ===
In Catholicism, three are mentioned by name:

- Gabriel
- Michael
- Raphael

These three are commemorated together liturgically on September 29. Each formerly had his own feast.

The latter of these identifies himself in Tobit 12:15^{(NAB)} thus: "I am Raphael, one of the seven angels who stand and serve before the Glory of the Lord."

The Fourth Book of Esdras, which mentions the angel Uriel (and also the "archangel" Jeremiel), was popular in the West and was frequently quoted by Church Fathers, especially Ambrose, but was never considered part of the Catholic biblical canon.

The Catholic Church gives no official recognition to the names given in some apocryphal sources, such as Raguel, Saraqael and Remiel (in the Book of Enoch) or Izidkiel, Hanael, and Kepharel (in other such sources).

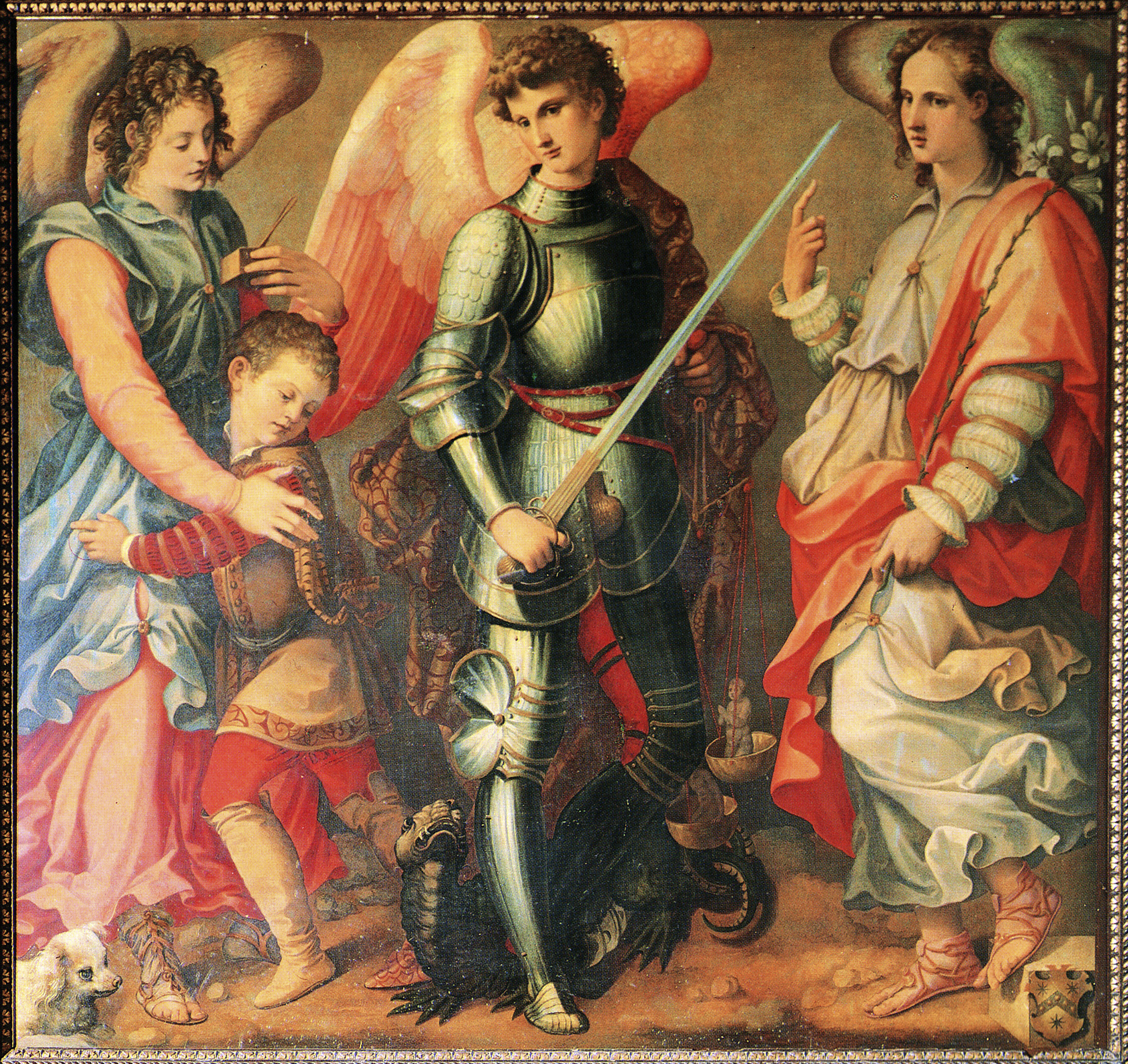
Michele Tosini, Archangels Raphael, Michael and Gabriel, showing their attributes in Catholic art

In 1851 Pope Pius IX approved the Chaplet of Saint Michael, based on the 1751 apparition of the Archangel Michael experienced by the Carmelite nun Antonia d'Astonac, which includes prayers with specific invocations to the Archangels and each of the nine Choirs of Angels.

Of the three major archangels in the Catholic hierarchy of angels, all normally with large wings, Archangel Michael is easy to recognize, in armour with a weapon (sword or spear), often standing on a winged man or a dragon representing Satan, and he may carry a pair of scales to represent his role in the Last Judgement. Gabriel carries a stem of lilies, traditionally part of the iconography of the Annunciation, his most significant work as the messenger of God. The iconography of Archangel Raphael derives from the story from the Book of Tobit of Tobias and the Angel. Especially in the Renaissance, Tobias, his dog and the fish he carries may all appear, otherwise Raphael holds a walker's staff, may wear sandals, and may carry a small container (for the healing organs from the giant fish Tobias caught).

=== Eastern Orthodox ===
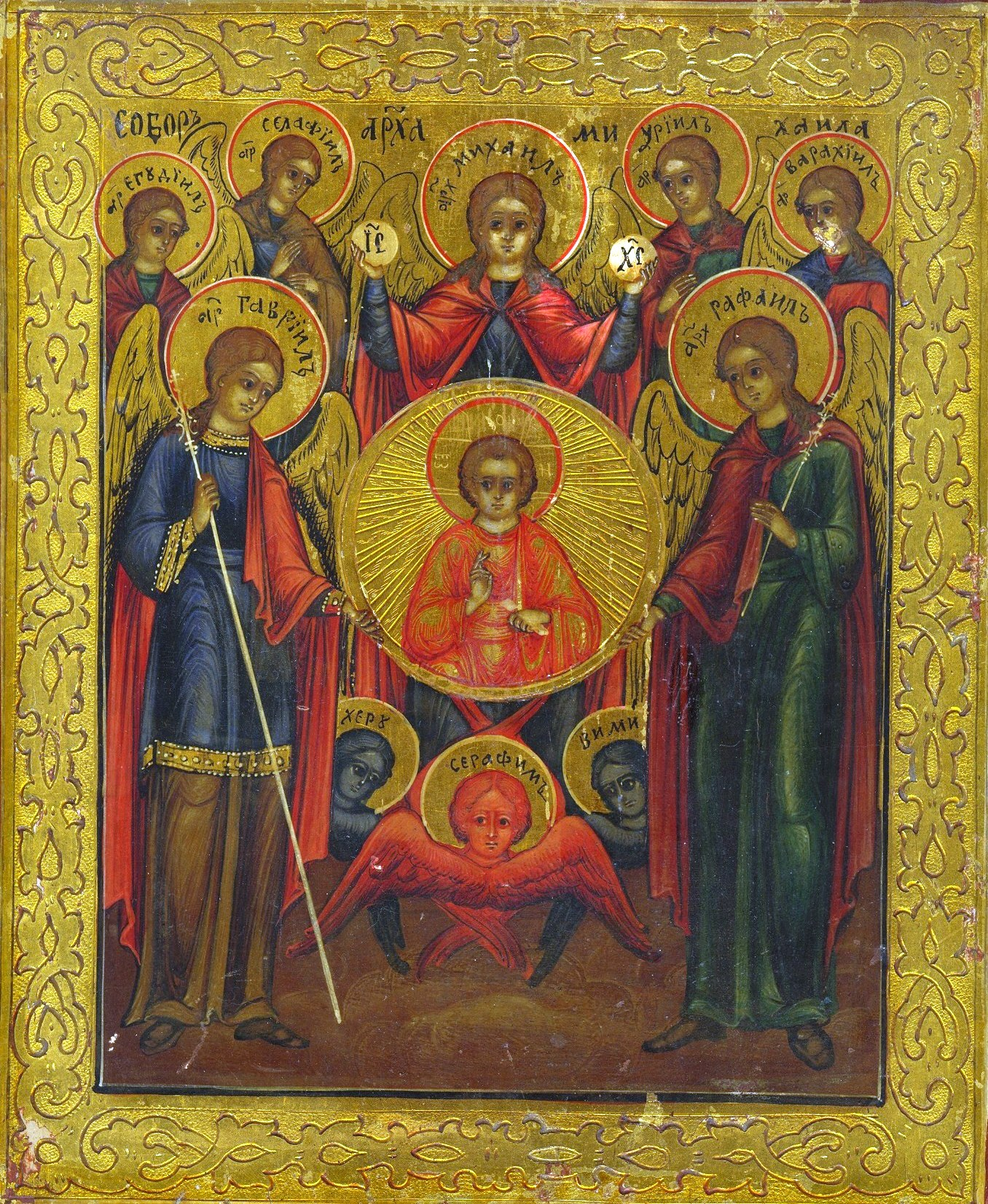
Angelic Council, Orthodox icon of the seven archangels, left to right: Jegudiel, Gabriel, Selaphiel, Michael, Uriel, Raphael, Barachiel. Beneath the mandorla of Christ-Immanuel (God is with us) are representations of Cherubim (blue) and Seraphim (red).

Eastern Orthodox Tradition mentions "thousands of archangels". Only Seven Archangels are venerated by name. Three are the same as mentioned in Catholicism; namely Michael, Gabriel, and Raphael. Uriel is included. The other three or four are most often named Selaphiel, Jegudiel, Barachiel and (sometimes) Jeremiel. The Orthodox Church celebrates the Synaxis of the Archangel Michael and the Other Bodiless Powers on November 8 of the Eastern Orthodox liturgical calendar (for those churches which follow the Julian Calendar, November 8 falls on November 21 of the modern Gregorian Calendar). Other feast days of the Archangels include the Synaxis of the Archangel Gabriel on March 26 (April 8) and July 13 (July 26), and the Miracle of the Archangel Michael at Colossae on September 6 (September 19). In addition, every Monday throughout the year is dedicated to the Angels, with special mention being made in the church hymns of Michael and Gabriel. In Orthodox iconography, each angel has a symbolic representation:

- Michael in the Hebrew language means "Who is like God?" or "Who is equal to God?" Michael has been depicted from earliest Christian times as a commander, who holds in his right hand a spear with which he attacks Lucifer/Satan, and in his left hand a green palm branch. At the top of the spear, there is a linen ribbon with a red cross. The Archangel Michael is especially considered to be the Guardian of the Orthodox Faith and a fighter against heresies.
- Gabriel in Hebrew means "God is my strength" or "Might of God". He is the herald of the mysteries of God, especially the Incarnation of God and all other mysteries related to it. He is depicted as follows: In his right hand, he holds a lantern with a lighted taper inside, and in his left hand, a mirror of green jasper. The mirror signifies the wisdom of God as a hidden mystery.
- Raphael is a Hebrew name which means "It is God who heals" or "God Heals". Raphael is depicted leading Tobias (who is carrying a fish caught in the Tigris) with his right hand and holding a physician's alabaster jar in his left hand.
- Uriel in the Hebrew language means "God is my light", or "Light of God" (2 Esdras 4:1, 5:20). He is depicted holding a sword in his right hand, and a flame in his left.
- Sealtiel means "Intercessor of God". He is depicted with his face and eyes lowered, holding his hands on his bosom in prayer.
- Samuel means "Glorifier of God". He is depicted bearing a golden wreath in his right hand and a triple-thonged whip in his left hand.
- Barachiel means "Blessed by God". He is depicted holding a white rose in his hand against his breast.
- Jerahmeel means "God's exaltation". He is venerated as an inspirer and awakener of exalted thoughts that raise a person toward God (2 Esdras 4:36). As an eighth, he is sometimes included as an archangel.

=== Coptic Orthodox ===
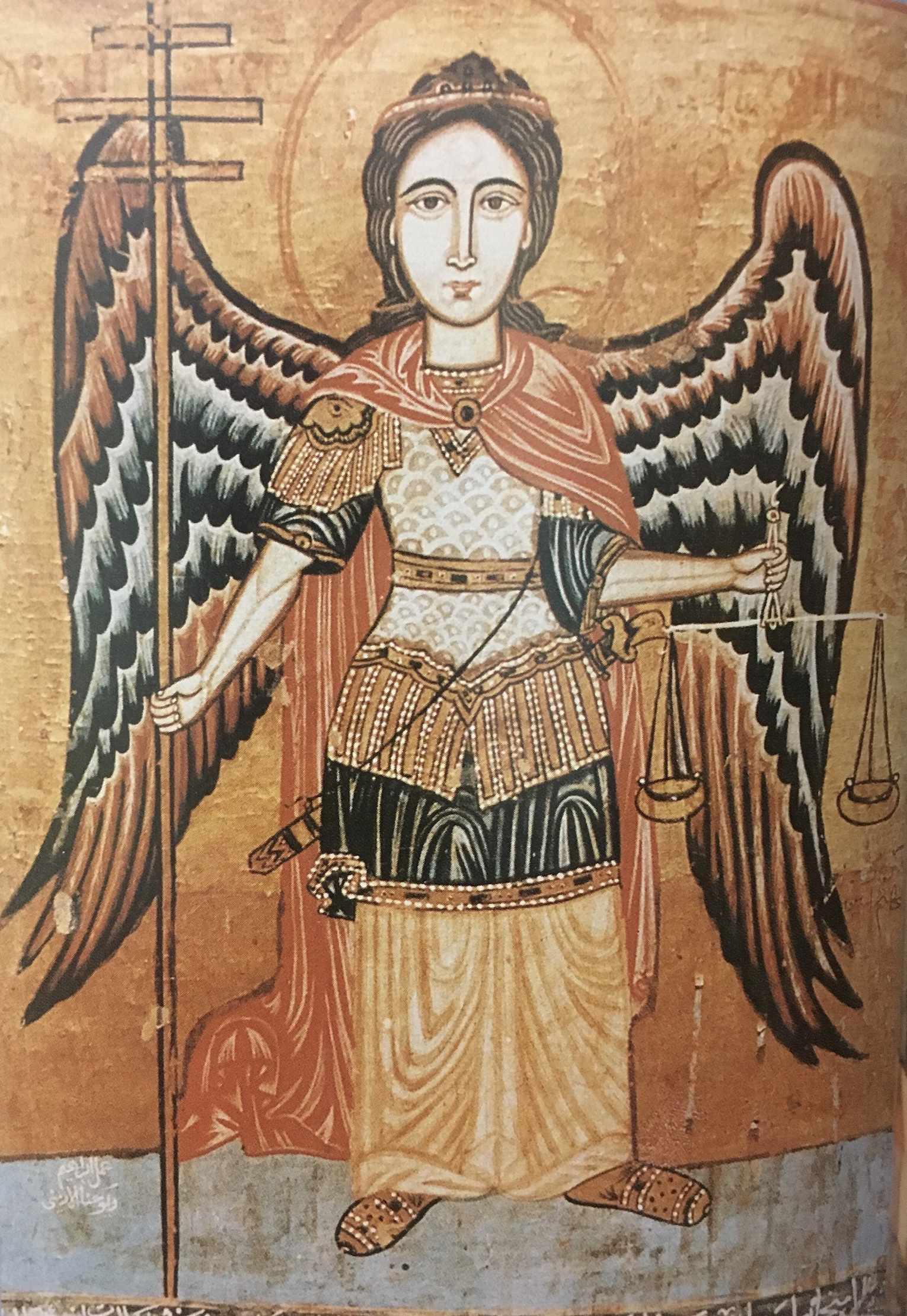
Coptic icon of the Archangel Michael. Among all the archangels, the Copts pay special attention to St Michael.

In addition to Michael, Gabriel and Raphael, the Coptic Orthodox Church recognises four more archangels by name:

- Suriel means "Prince of God"
- Sadakiel (Zedekiel; Sadakiel) means "Grace of God"
- Sarathiel (Serathial) means "Discipline of God"
- Ananiel means "Rain of God"

=== Ethiopian Orthodox ===
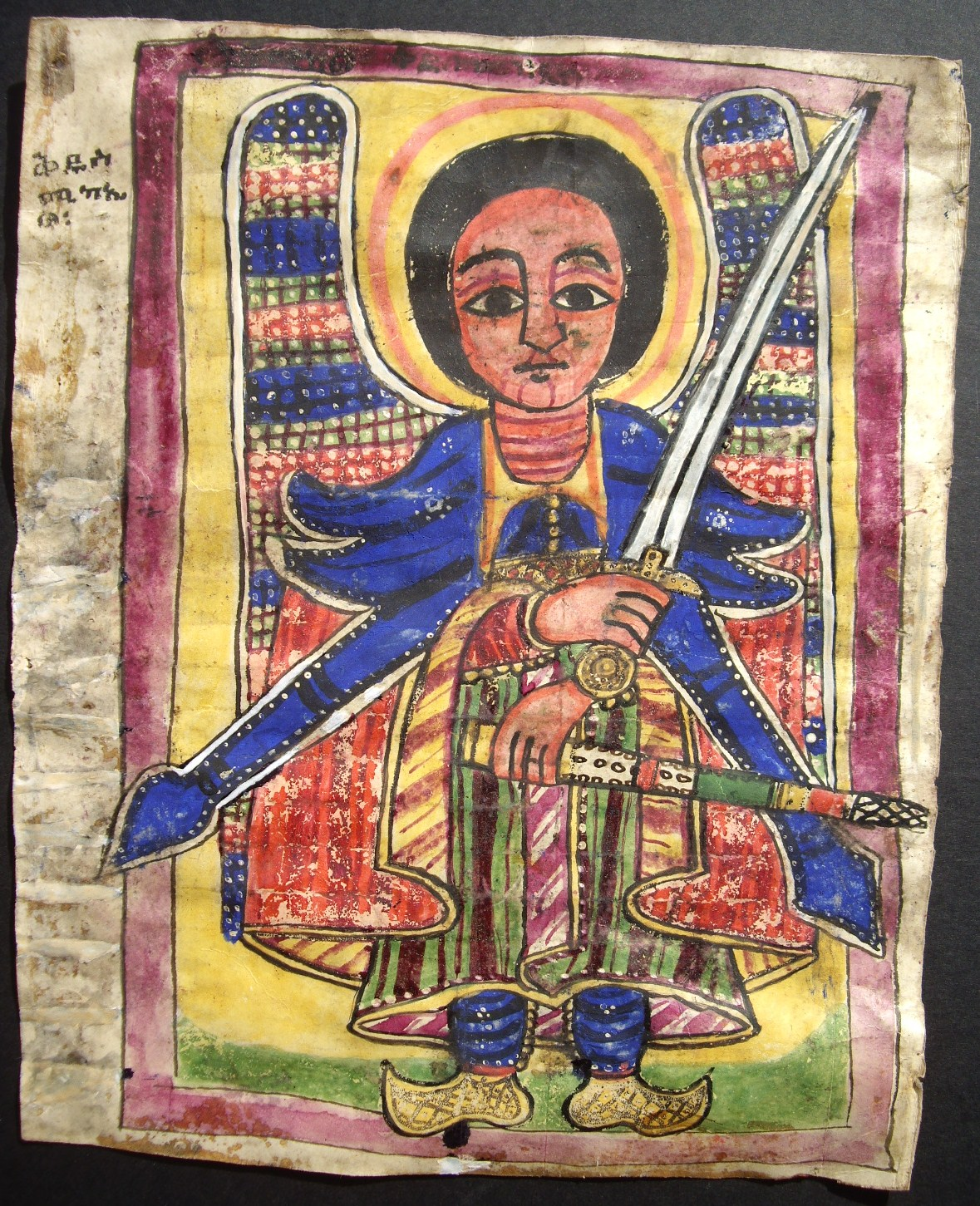
Ethiopian icon of an angel, possibly St Michael

The Ethiopian Orthodox Tewahedo Church venerates the four archangels Michael, Gabriel, Raphael, and Uriel, as well as:

- Phanuel, meaning "Face of God"
- Raguel, meaning "Friend of God"
- Remiel, meaning "Thunder of God"

In the canon of the Ethiopian Orthodox Tewahedo Church, 1 Enoch describes Saraqael as one of the angels who watch over "the spirits that sin in the spirit" (Enoch 20:7–8).

=== Protestant ===
The Protestant Bible provides names for two angels: "Michael the archangel" (Jude 1:9), and the angel Gabriel, who is called "the man Gabriel" in Daniel 9:21, which are each considered part of the standard New Testament canon and Old Testament canon respectively. It omits Raphael, who is mentioned in Tobit 12:15, which falls in the Apocrypha section of the Catholic Bible, and it omits Uriel (2 Esdras 4:1 and 2 Esdras 5:20) and Jerahmeel (2 Esdras 4:36), which are contained in 2 Esdras, neither are included in the Protestant Bible. Among Protestant communities, the Anglican traditions recognize three to five angels as archangels: Michael the Archangel and Gabriel the Archangel, as well as Raphael the Archangel, Uriel the Archangel and Jerahmeel the Archangel. Lutherans only recognise Michael, Gabriel, and sometimes Raphael (not Uriel or Jerahmeel, because Esdras books are not included in the Lutheran apocrypha). Statuary of these angels can be found in Lutheran churches, and a depiction of seven archangels in stained-glass windows can be found in some Anglican churches. In this case, in addition to the aforementioned angels, Chamuel, Jophiel and Zadkiel are variously depicted. They are commemorated on 29 September, "Michaelmas", in the church calendar of the Lutheran and Anglican churches (cf. Calendar of saints (Lutheran) and Calendar of saints (Anglican)).

In the view of the Baptist evangelist Billy Graham, Sacred Scripture explicitly described one being as an archangel—Michael—in Jude 1:9.

Seventh-day Adventists hold that the titles "Michael" and "archangel" are references to Jesus. In the Adventist view, they only signify his role as chief of angels and make no reference to his divine nature. Adventists credit nonconformist minister Matthew Henry as supporting this view.

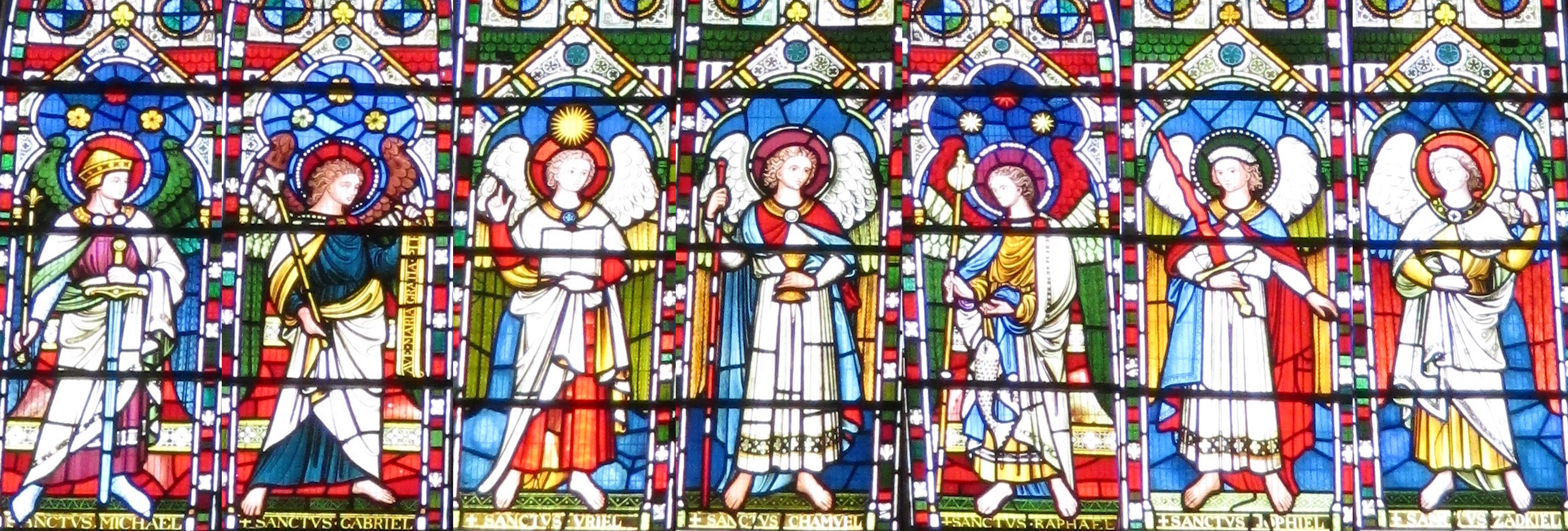
Seven archangels depicted in the stained-glass window at St Michael's Church, Brighton; from left: Michael, Gabriel, Uriel, Chamuel (Camael), Raphael, Jophiel, and Zadkiel

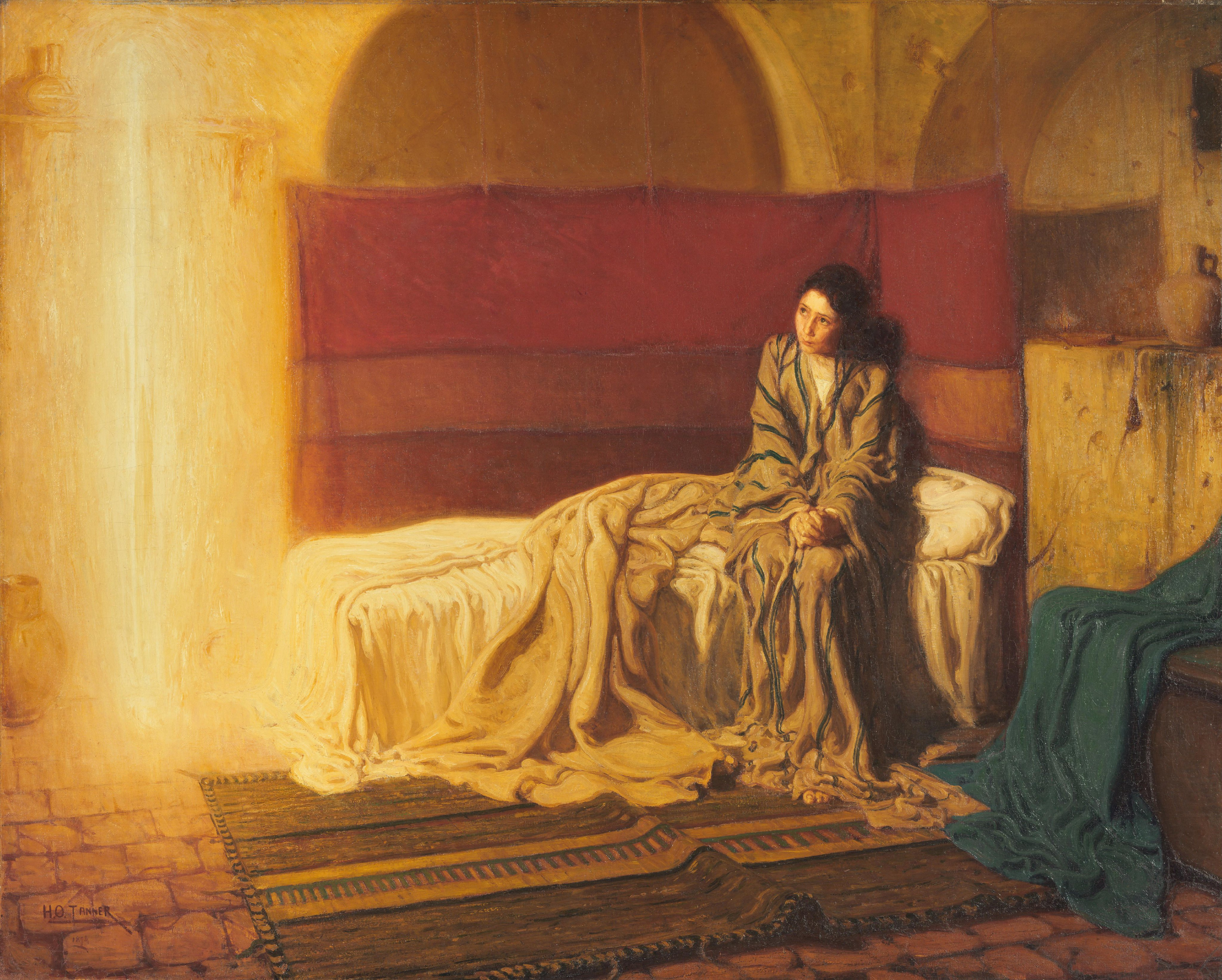
The Annunciation by Henry Ossawa Tanner

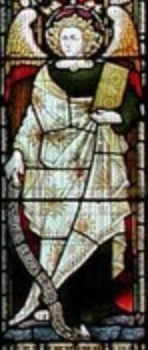
The Archangel Jeremiel holding a book, depicted in a stained-glass window at St Michael and All Angels Church, Hughenden

=== Jehovah's Witnesses ===
Jehovah's Witnesses, citing a reference to "the voice of the archangel" at 1 Thessalonians 4:16, also believe that "Michael" is another name for Jesus in heaven. They believe Jesus is an archangel in the true sense of the word—the supreme leader of angels.

=== The Church of Jesus Christ of Latter-day Saints ===
The Church of Jesus Christ of Latter-day Saints (LDS Church) interprets the term "archangel" as meaning "Chief Angel", Michael is the only individual so designated in the Latter Day Saints canon. It is believed that he is the head of all of the angels. LDS Church doctrine also states that the archangel Michael was the first man, Adam. Though no other being is identified as an "archangel", Joseph Smith taught that the angel Gabriel was known in mortality as Noah and the angel Raphael is a being of significant standing, even though he has never been identified with any mortal prophet.

== Islam ==
In Islam, the mentioned archangels (Karubiyin) in the Islamic exegetical traditions are:

- Gabriel (Jibrāʾīl or Jibrīl in Arabic). Gabriel is said to be the archangel responsible for transmitting God's revelations to all prophets, including revealing the Quran to Prophet Muhammad and inducing him to recite it. Various hadiths (traditions) mention his role in delivering messages from "God the Almighty" to the prophets.
- Michael (Mīkāʾīl or Mīkāl in Arabic). Michael is often depicted as the archangel of mercy who is responsible for bringing rain and thunder to Earth.
- Raphael (Isrāfīl or Rafāʾīl in Arabic). The name is not mentioned in the Quran, but it's mentioned in Sunan Muslim. Considered in Islam by some to be the angel of the trumpet responsible for signalling the coming of Judgment Day.
- Angel of death (Malak al-Mawt in Arabic and in the Qur'an, also called Azra'il, but this name is not mentioned in the Qur'an). Taking the soul of the dead to heaven or hell in the intermediary realm (Barzakh).

== Gnosticism ==
In the Gnostic codex On the Origin of the World, the aeon named Sophia sends seven archangels from her light to save the Archon Sabaoth, the son of Yaldabaoth, after the authorities of Chaos make war in the Seven Heavens. He is then placed in a divine kingdom above the twelve gods of Chaos and becomes the consort of Zoe (the primordial Eve), who gives him knowledge of the eighth heaven, while the seven archangels stand before them. In the Sophia of Jesus Christ and Eugnostos the Blessed, the primordial Adam creates myriads of gods and archangels without number.

== Occultism ==
Occultists sometimes associate archangels in Kabbalistic fashion with various seasons or elements, or even colours. In some Kabbalah-based systems of ceremonial magic, the main four (Gabriel, Michael, Raphael and Uriel) are invoked to guard the four quarters (directions) and their corresponding colours are associated with magical properties. In the lesser ritual of the pentagram, the invocation includes: "Before me Raphael; Behind me Gabriel; On my right hand Michael; On my left hand Uriel."

== See also ==
- Angels in art
- Angel of the Lord
- Bene Elohim
- Fallen angel
- List of angels in theology
- Saint Michael in the Catholic Church
- Sopo Archangels, Colombian Baroque paintings
