= Jerahmeel (archangel) =

Archangel appearing in the Hebrew Bible

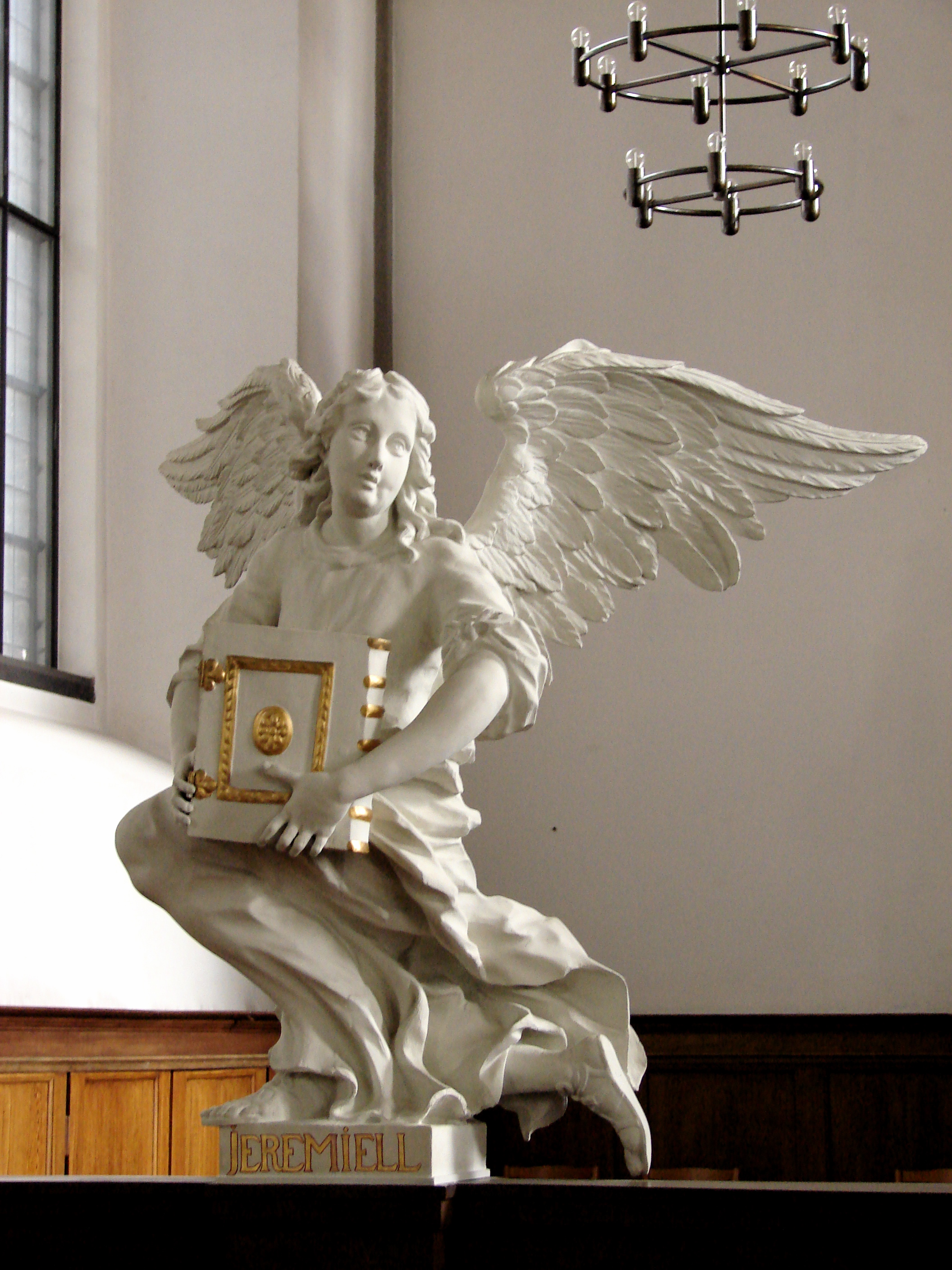
- Statue of the angel Jeremiel in the Church of Our Saviour, Copenhagen

Archangel
- Venerated in: Judaism, Eastern Catholic Churches, Eastern Orthodox Church, Lutheran Churches, Anglican Communion, Messianic Judaism
- Feast: 8 November
- Attributes: Balance scales

The Hebrew name Jerahmeel (Hebrew: יְרַחְמְאֵל Yəraḥməʾēl, Tiberian: Yăraḥmē̆ʾēl, "God shall have mercy"), which appears several times in the Tanakh (see the article Jerahmeel), also appears in various forms as the name of an archangel in books of the intertestamental and early Christian periods.

== Scripture ==
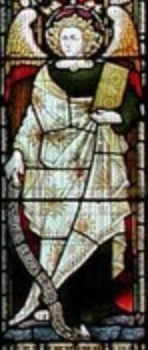
Archangel Jeremiel holding a book, which is also the attribute of the archangel Uriel. Detail of a stained-glass window at St Michael and All Angels Anglican Church, Hughenden.

The book 2 Esdras, also known as 4 Ezra, is regarded as canonical by the Ethiopian Orthodox Church and falls within the intertestamental books of the Apocrypha in Protestant Bibles used by the Lutheran churches and the Anglican Communion; it has come down to us in Latin and appears as an appendix to the Vulgate. There is a reference in chapter 4 verse 36, to Jeremiel (in the Latin Ieremihel), which, however, does not occur in all the manuscripts. Other versions have Remiel or Uriel. In this passage, the angel or angels (Uriel is also there) are answering Ezra's many questions about heaven and hell.

Jeremiel (under any of his name alterations: Eremiel, Remiel, etc.) had a very dour yet comforting duty in the pre-Christian eras. He is mentioned in Chapter 20 of the Book of Enoch written around [300 B.C.] as Remiel; one of the seven holy angels whom God set over those who rise.

Later on in Christian theology, he was set over Sheol (the underworld) in Abrahamic tradition, in particular the "Bosom of Abraham", a region of the underworld almost identical in concept to the Greek idea of Elysium. Here Jeremiel was responsible for placating the righteous souls awaiting the Lord who resided there. In post-Christian world Jeremiel's duty evolved and is paired with St. Simon Peter as gatekeeper of Heaven. In both cases, Jeremiel watches over and guides the holy deceased in their afterlife journey. Possibly due to influence of Enoch 1 written earlier.

In the Apocalypse of Zephaniah, an apocryphal book which has come down to us in Coptic, the angel referred to as Eremiel tells Zephaniah

I am the great angel, Eremiel, who is over the abyss and Hades, the one in which all of the souls are imprisoned from the end of the Flood, which came upon the earth, until this day

For modern uses of the angel's name and identity, see the article Ramiel.

== Enumeration ==
There are seven to eight archangels venerated by the Orthodox Christians: Michael, Gabriel, Raphael, Uriel, Selathiel, Jegudiel, and Barachiel, with an eighth, Jeremiel, added to this number. He is depicted holding balance scales in Orthodox iconography. In the Lutheran and Anglican traditions, three to five archangels are recognized, including Michael the Archangel and Gabriel the Archangel (who are mentioned in the canonical books), as well as Raphael the Archangel, Uriel the Archangel and Jerahmeel the Archangel (who are named in the intertestamental books of the Protestant Apocrypha).

== See also ==
- List of angels in theology
