= Chamuel =

Chamuel may refer to:

- Michelle Chamuel, American singer-songwriter
- Camael, an angel in Judeo-Christian theology and angelology
- Chamuel (wrestler), Mexican professional wrestler
