= Sarathiel =

Angel in the Oriental Orthodox church

Archangel
- Venerated in: Coptic Orthodox Church

Sarathiel or Serathiel (Coptic: ⲥⲁⲣⲁⲑⲓⲏⲗ) is an angel in Oriental Orthodox church angelology, especially in the Coptic Orthodox Church, and is often included in lists as being one of the Seven Archangels. The angel is described as having dominion over discipline and penance.

== See also ==
- List of angels in theology
- Selaphiel, which may be an alternate name for the same archangel
