= Zadkiel =

Archangel in Judaism and Christianity

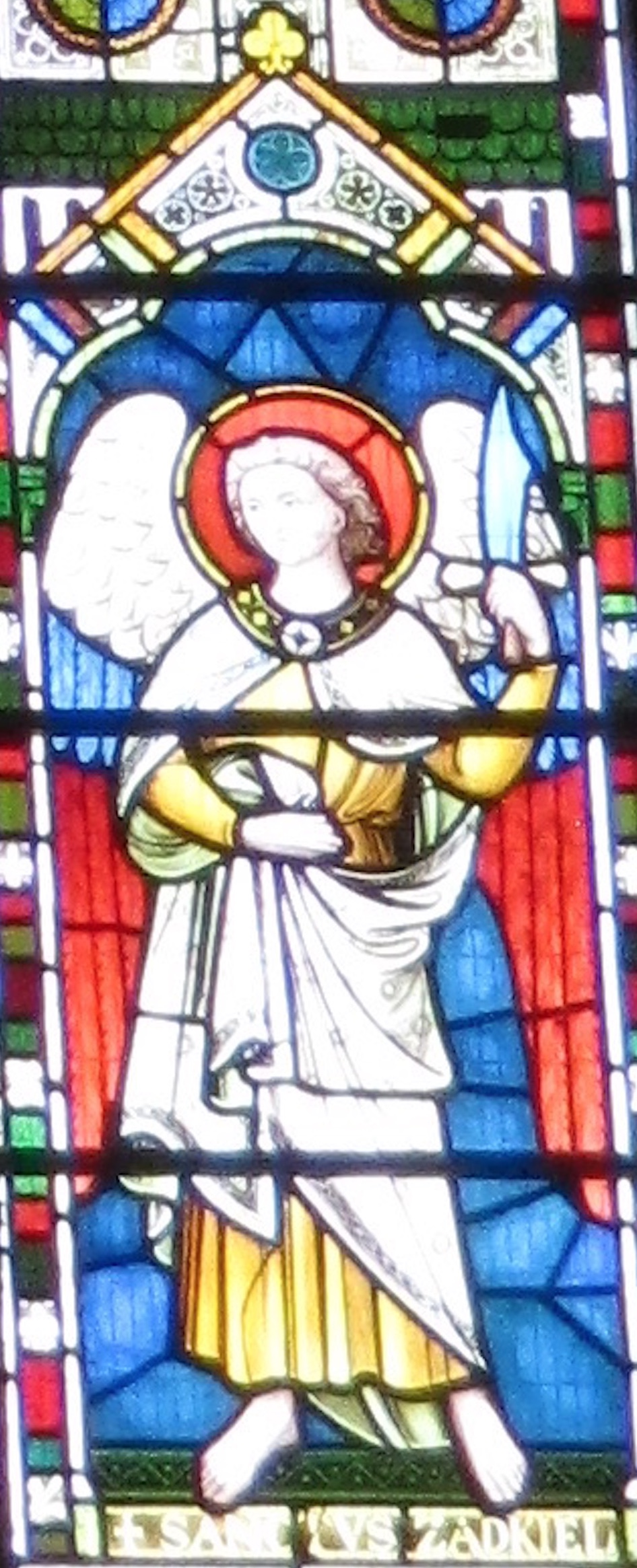
- Sanctus Zadkiel, stained glass window at St Michael's Church, Brighton, England.

Archangel
- Venerated in: Judaism, Anglicanism, Coptic Orthodoxy
- Attributes: Dagger

Zadkiel (Hebrew: צִדְקִיאֵל Ṣīḏqīʾēl, 'God is my Righteousness'), also known as Hasdiel, (Note: Hebrew: חַסְדִּיאֵל Ḥasdīʾēl, "God is my Kindness"; Coptic: ⲥⲉⲇⲁⲕⲓⲏⲗ Sedakiel) is an archangel in Jewish and Christian angelology. Zadkiel is the archangel of kindness, benevolence and mercy.

== Abraham sacrifice ==
As an angel of mercy, some texts claim that Zadkiel is the unnamed biblical Angel of the Lord who holds back Abraham to prevent the patriarch from sacrificing his son, Isaac. Because of this, he is usually shown holding a dagger. Other texts cite Michael or Tadhiel or some other angel as the angel intended, while others interpret the Angel of the Lord as a theophany.

== Associated symbolism ==
In Jewish mysticism and Christian Kabbalah, Zadkiel is associated with the classical planet Jupiter. The angel's position in the sephirot is fourth, which corresponds to Chesed "Kindness".

== In popular culture ==
In the Japanese light novel series Date A Live, Zadkiel is a spiritual weapon (referred to as angels within the series), belonging to Yoshino Himekawa. Zadkiel takes the form of a rabbit shaped giant with the ability to control ice and the weather.

== See also ==
- List of angels in theology
- Sydyk

== Bibliography ==
- Davidson, Gustav (1967). A dictionary of angels: including the fallen angels. Free Press. ISBN 9780029070505.
- Lewis, James R.; Oliver, Evelyn Dorothy (2008). Angels A to Z. Visible Ink Press. p. xviii. ISBN 9781578592579.
