= Ananiel =

Angel

Ananiel, Anânêl (Hebrew/Aramaic: עננאל, Greek: Ανανιας) was the 14th Watcher of the 20 leaders of the 200 fallen angels who are mentioned in the Book of Enoch, an ancient Jewish religious text. The name Ananiel is sometimes translated as "Rain of God" though it is often confused with the name Hananiel. Michael Knibb interprets the name as "cloud of God", which is the literal meaning of the name in Hebrew. The Arabic form of the name entered the language through Coptic translations from Greek.

Ananiel was entrusted by God "all the trees of the earth, its plants, the rain, the dew, the heat, the simoom, the wind and as many [atmospheric phenomena] as there are in summer and winter." He is also known as an angelic guard of the gates of the South Wind, one of three gates that control the weather, described in The Book of Enoch. Conversely, according to the tradition of the Coptic Orthodox Church, Ananiel is the name of one of the seven holy archangels.

== See also ==
- List of angels in theology
