= Camael =

Angel in Judeo-Christian tradition

Saint Camael
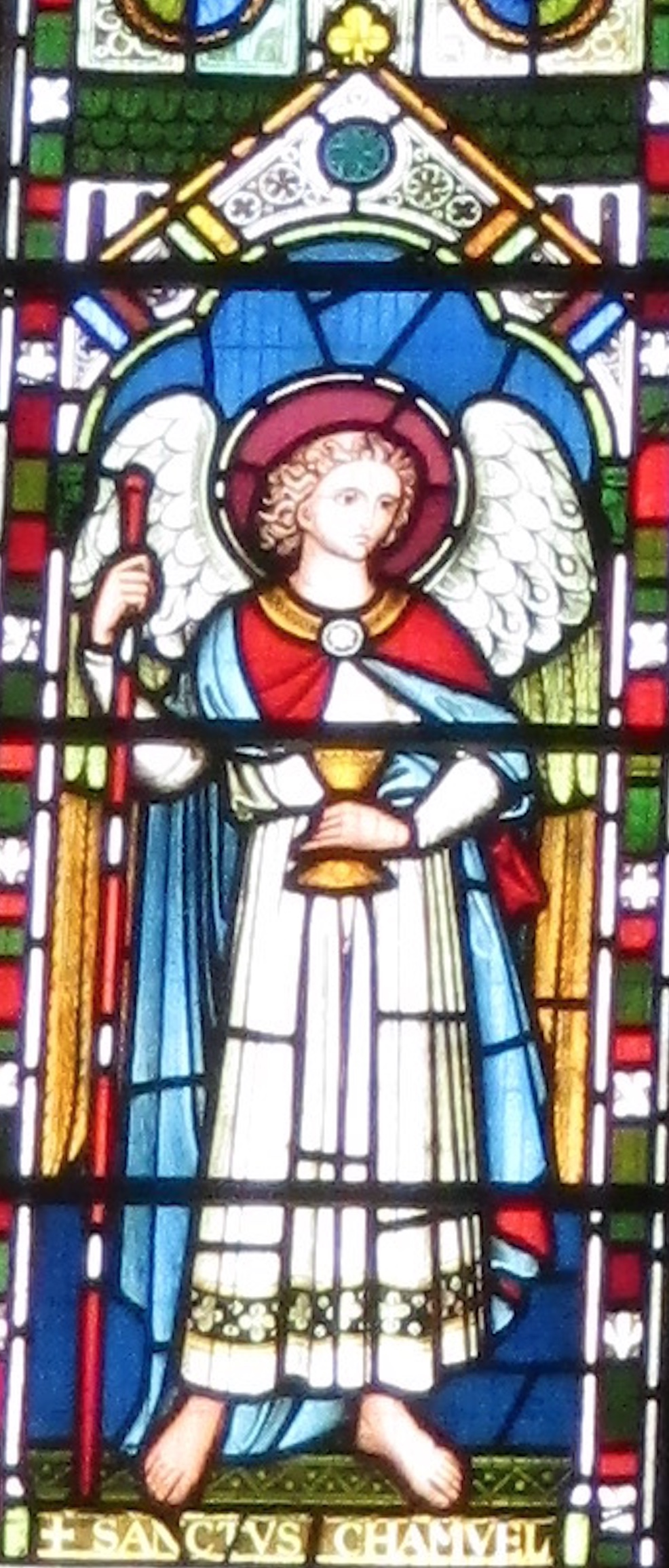
- Sanctus Chamuel, stained-glass window at St Michael's Church, Brighton, England.

Archangel
- Venerated in: Judaism, Anglicanism
- Feast: 29 September
- Attributes: Chalice, staff

Camael, also spelled Kamael, Chamuel, Khamuel, Camiel, Cameel and Camniel, is an archangel in Christian angelology. Chamuel is the archangel of love, peace and harmony.

Camael was excluded from the Holy See's list of named angels in the 2001 Directory on popular piety, which states: "The practice of assigning names to the Holy Angels should be discouraged, except in the cases of Gabriel, Raphael, and Michael whose names are contained in Holy Scripture".

Yanic Truesdale starred as Chamuel in the American television show God's Favorite Idiot.

== See also ==
- List of angels in theology
