= Jegudiel =

Archangel of praise to God

Saint Jegudiel
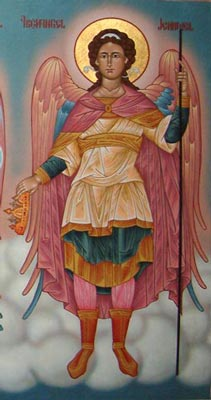
- Icon of the Archangel Jegudiel

Archangel
- Venerated in: Eastern Orthodox Church; Eastern Catholic Church
- Feast: 8 November
- Attributes: Crown, whip

Jegudiel (Hebrew: יַחְדִּיאֵל Yaḥdīʾēl, "God is One"), also known as Saint Iehudiel, is one of the seven Archangels in the Eastern Orthodox tradition.

== Iconography ==
He is often depicted in iconography holding a crown and a three-thonged whip in hand, which symbolizes reward from God for the righteous and punishment for the sinners. The classic Eastern Orthodox depiction usually shows him standing upright, holding a crown in his right hand, and a rod or staff in his left hand.

== Patronage ==
Jegudiel is the patron of all who work in some field of endeavor, and the crown he holds symbolizes the reward for successful spiritual labors.

Along with his subordinate angels, he is the advisor and defender of all who work in positions of responsibility to the glory of God, and as such is resorted to by kings, judges, and others in positions of leadership. Jegudiel is also known as the bearer of God's merciful love and also an angel over Friday. He is considered one of the seven archangels in a variant Catholic system, which pairs each archangel with a specific day of the week and attribute. With regard to the history of the archangel's name, it is thought to have first been mentioned in the non-canonical Book of Enoch between 130 BC and 68 AD.

== See also ==
- List of angels in theology
- "The World of The Angels". Transfiguration of Our Lord Russian Orthodox Church.
