= Heavenly host =

Army of angels mentioned in the Bible

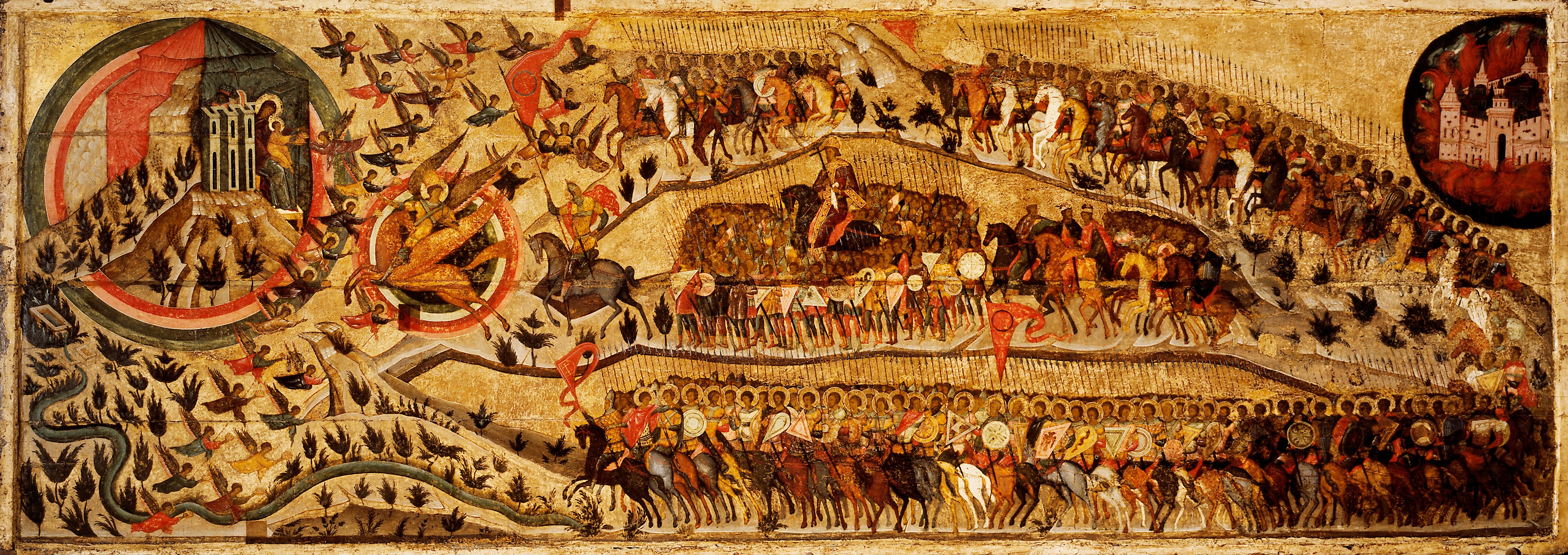
Blessed Be the Host of the King of Heaven, a Russian icon from the 1550s

The Heavenly host (Hebrew: צבא השמים tsva hashamayim) originally referred to the sun, moon, and stars (Deuteronomy 4:19) conceived of as an army, and later referred to the army (or host) of God, as mentioned in Abrahamic texts; the Hebrew and Christian Bibles, and the Quran in particular.

Some Biblical passages indicate entities making up the divine army such as stars (Daniel 4:35,Judges 5:20, Isaiah 40:26). Referring to the heavenly bodies, the Israelites were commanded not to worship the host of heaven.

The Bible also describes the Heavenly host as being made up of angels, and gives several descriptions of angels in military terms, such as their encampment (Genesis 32:1–2), command structure (Psalms 91:11–12; Matt.13:41; Rev.7:2), and participation in combat (Job 19:12; Rev.12:7). In Christian theology, the heavenly host participate in the war in Heaven.

In the Quran, the heavenly hosts aid Muslims in the battle against the polytheistic enemies of Muhammad.

== Hebrew Bible ==
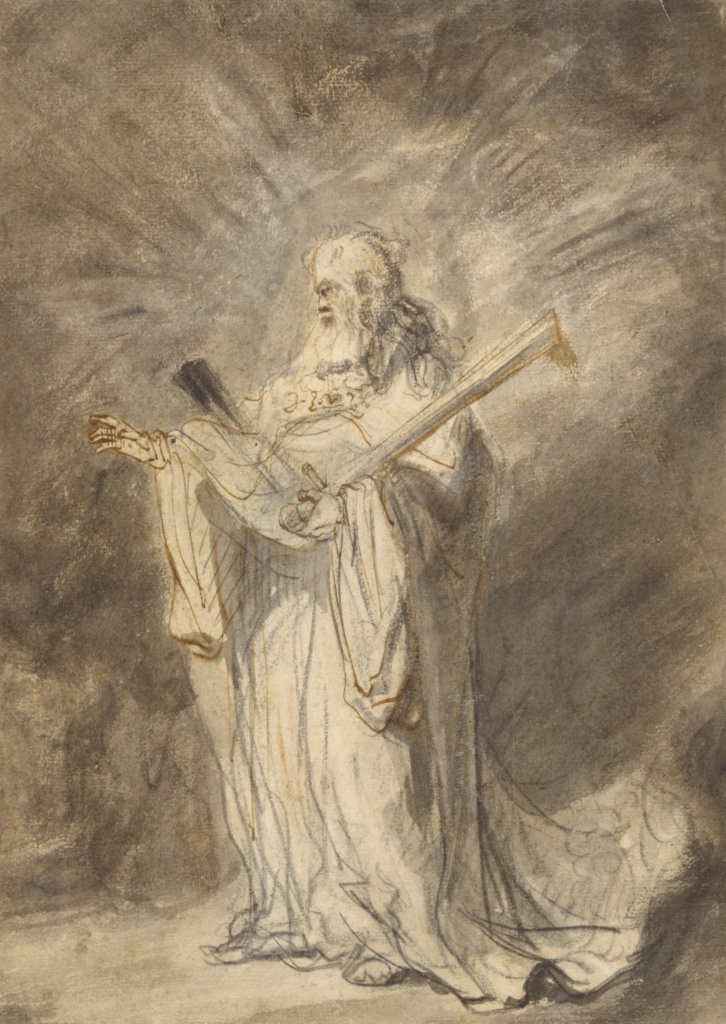
Depiction of the Commander of the Lord's Army in Joshua 5, by Ferdinand Bol, 1642.

In the Hebrew Bible, the name Yahweh and the title Elohim (literally 'gods' or 'godhood', usually rendered as 'God' in English translations) frequently occur with the word tzevaot or sabaoth ("hosts" or "armies", Hebrew: ṣəḇāʾōṯ) as YHWH Elohe Tzevaot ("YHWH God of Hosts"), Elohe Tzevaot ("God of Hosts"), Adonai YHWH Tzevaot ("Lord YHWH of Hosts") or, most frequently, YHWH Tzevaot ("YHWH of Hosts"). This name is traditionally transliterated in Latin as Sabaoth, a form that will be more familiar to many English readers, as it is used in the King James Version of the Bible.

In the Book of Joshua 5:13–15, Joshua encounters a "captain of the host of the Lord" in the early days of his campaigns in the Promised Land. This unnamed heavenly messenger is sent by God to encourage Joshua in the upcoming claiming of the Promised Land:

Once when Joshua was by Jericho, he looked up and saw a man standing before him with a drawn sword in his hand. Joshua went to him and said to him, “Are you one of us or one of our adversaries?”

He replied, “Neither, but as commander of the army of the Lord I have now come.” And Joshua fell on his face to the earth and worshiped, and he said to him, “What do you command your servant, my lord?”

The commander of the army of the Lord said to Joshua, “Remove the sandals from your feet, for the place where you stand is holy.” And Joshua did so.

— Joshua 5:13–15 (NRSV)

== Quran ==
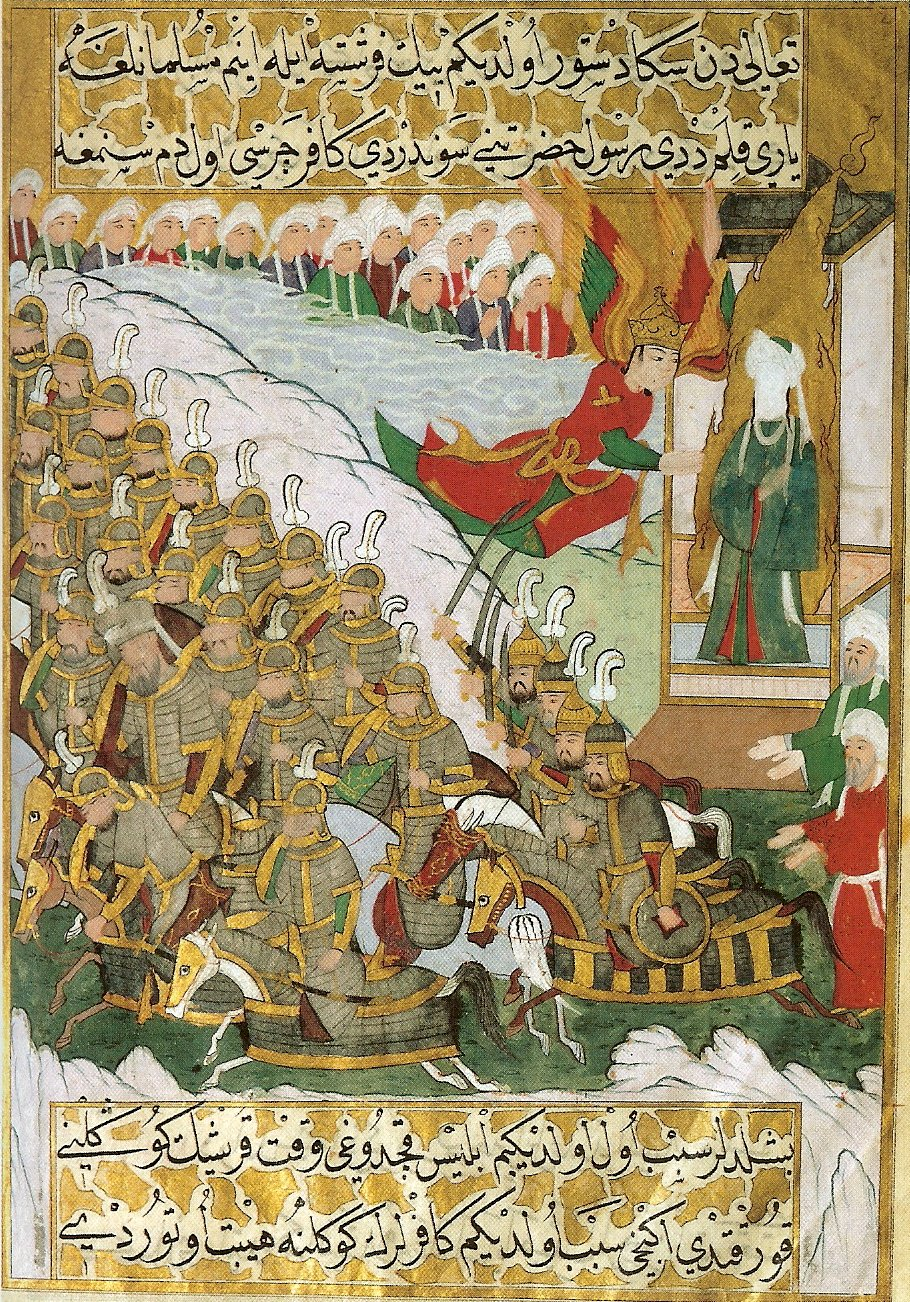
Muhammad at the Battle of Badr, advised by an angel. (Siyer-i Nebi, 16th century)

The Quran mentions God's army (Arabic: جندالله, romanized: Jundallah) in Quran 9:40, Quran 33:9, and Quran 9:40; angels sent down by God to aid the believers in battle, comparable to the heavenly host (Sabaoth) mentioned in the Books of Samuel.

The term junud refers explicitly to hosts of spirits. The evil spirits too have their host called the "junud iblīs" (the invisible hosts of Satan). The Quran describes the angelic host intervening on behalf of the Muslims during the Battle of Badr to fight against the šayāṭīn (devils)

In Islamic theology and philosophy, the battle of these two hosts are reflected in the internal struggle of the "human heart" (qalb) (al-Ghazali). Unlike Christianity, dualistic tendencies are usually minimized in Islamic tradition, and God is ultimately in control of both hosts; enabling a choice to side with either of these created beings.

== Baháʼí Faith ==
The term "Lord of Hosts" is also used in the Baháʼí Faith as a title of God. Bahá'u'lláh, claiming to be the Manifestation of God, wrote tablets to many of the kings and rulers of the world inviting them to recognize him as the Promised One of all ages and faiths, some of which were compiled and published in English as The Summons of the Lord of Hosts.

== Ugarit ==
Karel van der Toorn says the Ugaritic texts put the council of heavens (dr dt šmm) in synonymous parallelism with the assembly of the stars (pḫr kkbm) and the sons of El (bn il), meaning the gods.

== See also ==
- Astrotheology
- Divine Council
- Hierarchy of angels
- List of angels in theology
- Trisagion
