= Barachiel =

Archangel

Saint Barachiel
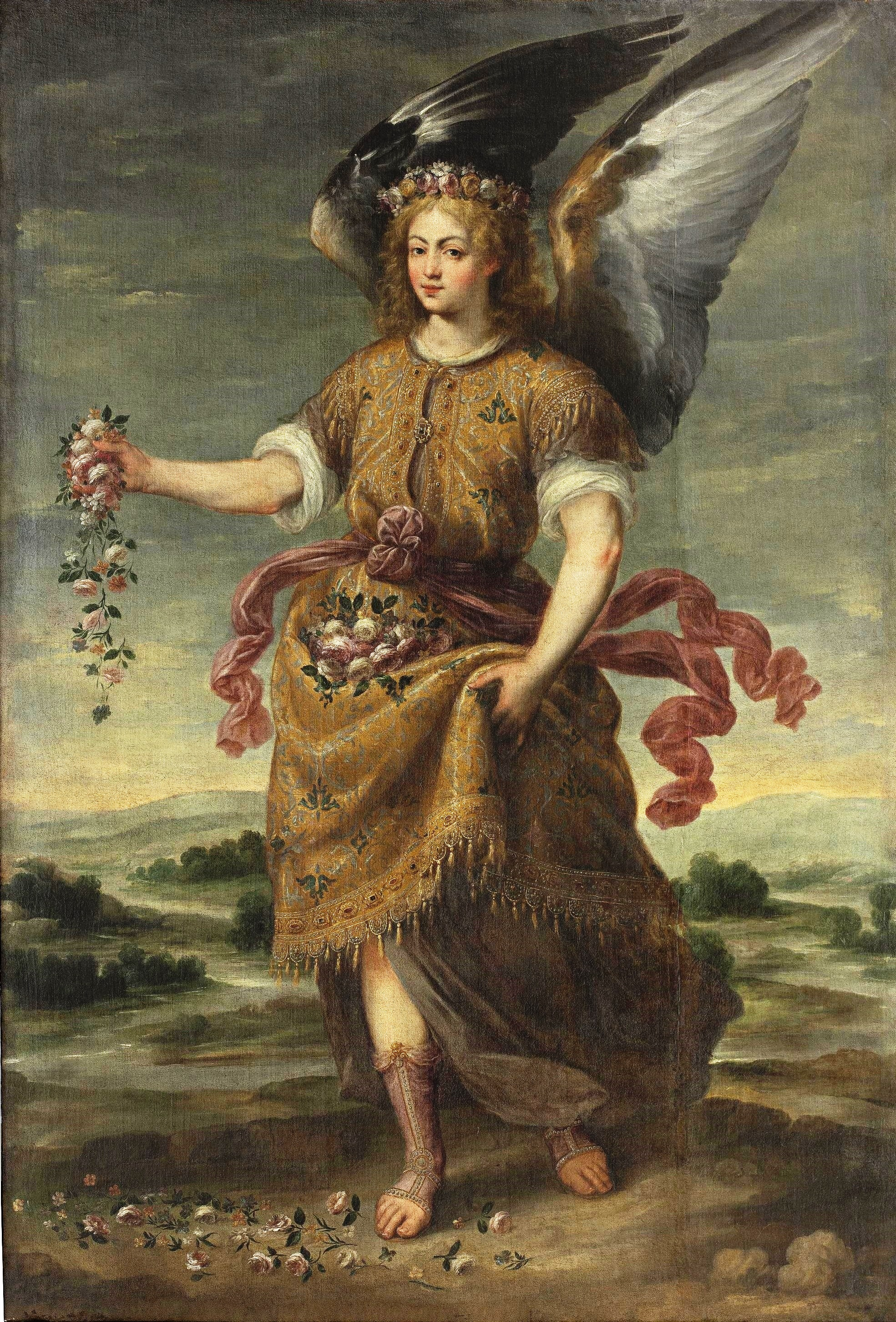
- Archangel Barachiel Scattering Flowers by Bartolomé Román, 17th century.

Archangel
- Venerated in: Judaism; Eastern Catholic Churches; Eastern Orthodox Church
- Feast: 8 November
- Attributes: Rose, rose petals

Barachiel (Hebrew: בַּרַכְאֵל Baraḵʾēl, "God has blessed"), also known as Barakel or Barakiel, is one of the Archangels in Judaism, as well as Byzantine Catholic and Eastern Orthodox tradition. He is the Archangel of Blessings.

In the Third Book of Enoch, he is described as one of the angelic princes, with a myriad of some 496,000 ministering angels attending him. He is described in the Almadel of Solomon as one of the chief angels of the first and fourth chora. In Jewish tradition, he is often associated with blessings, the planet Jupiter, and the Sephirah of Chesed.

== Iconography ==
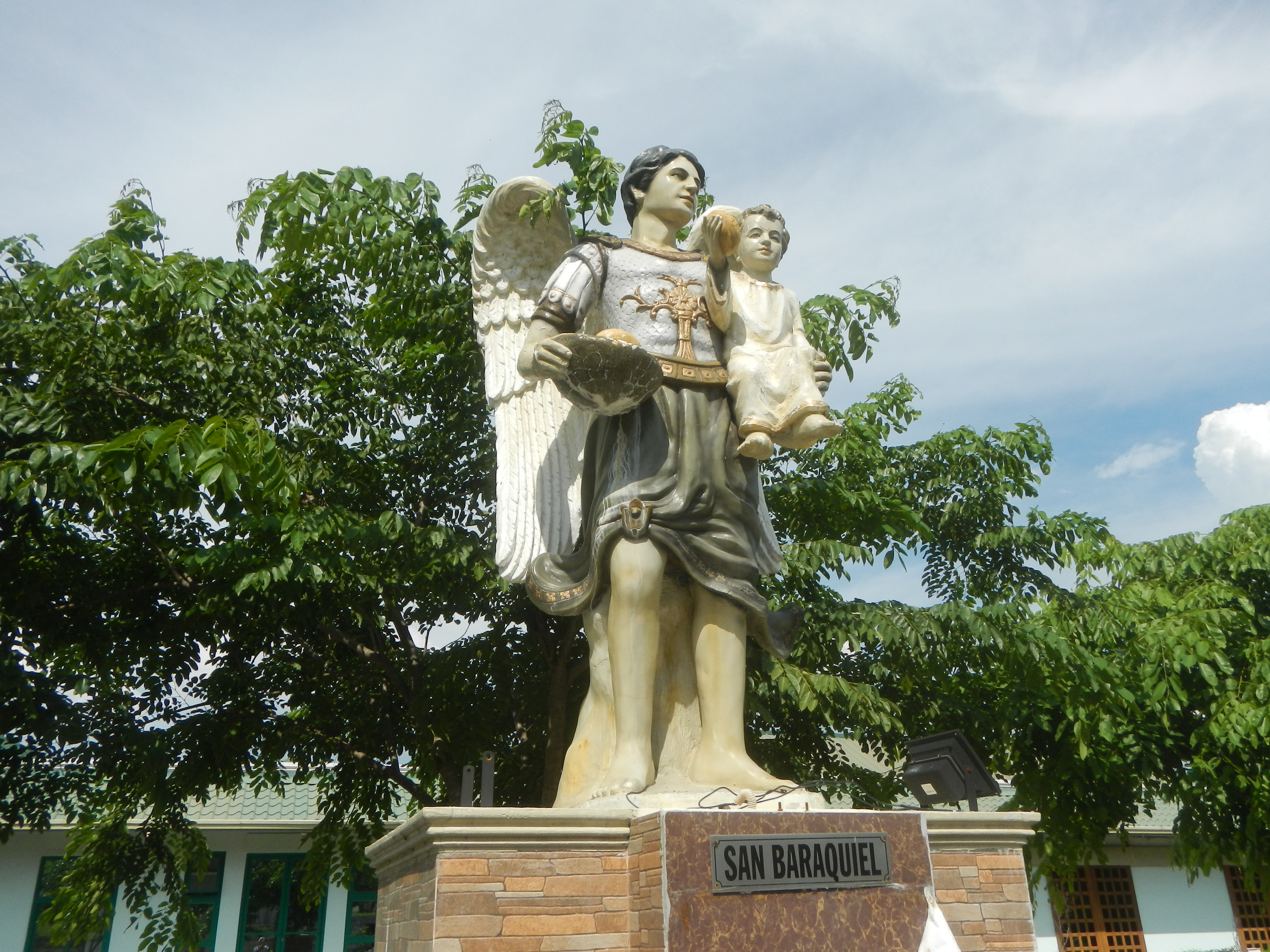
Statue of Saint Baraquiel

In iconography, Barachiel is sometimes shown holding a white rose against the chest, or with rose petals scattered on the clothing, particularly the cloak. The scattering of rose petals was to symbolize or represent God's sweet blessings showering down on people. Barachiel is also depicted holding a bread basket or a staff, both of which symbolize the blessings of children that God bestows on parents.

== Patronage ==
Barachiel's responsibilities are as varied as the blessings for which the archangel is named. Barachiel is also the chief of the guardian angels and it is written that Barachiel may be prayed to for all the benefits which the guardian angel is thought to confer if one is not praying to the guardian angel directly, but as an intercession. He is seen as an official saint in Byzantine Catholic and Eastern Orthodox tradition, in particular a patron of family and married life. He is also seen as the angel assigned by God to watch over converts (also called "adopted children of God") to assist them in their lives. He is also invoked as the special guardian of those born on Saturday.

Barachiel is also traditionally associated with the month of February and the Zodiacal sign Pisces. He is also sometimes described as being the ruler of the planet Jupiter and the zodiacal sign Scorpio.

== Literature ==
The Third Book of Enoch describes Archangel Barachiel as one of the Princes of the Host, who is appointed over the second heaven which is in the height of (Merom) Raqia. He and the other Holy Princes are also said to be accompanied by 496,000 myriads of Ministering Angels.

== See also ==
- List of angels in theology
