= Selaphiel =

Archangel in Byzantine Catholic and Eastern Orthodox tradition

Saint Selaphiel
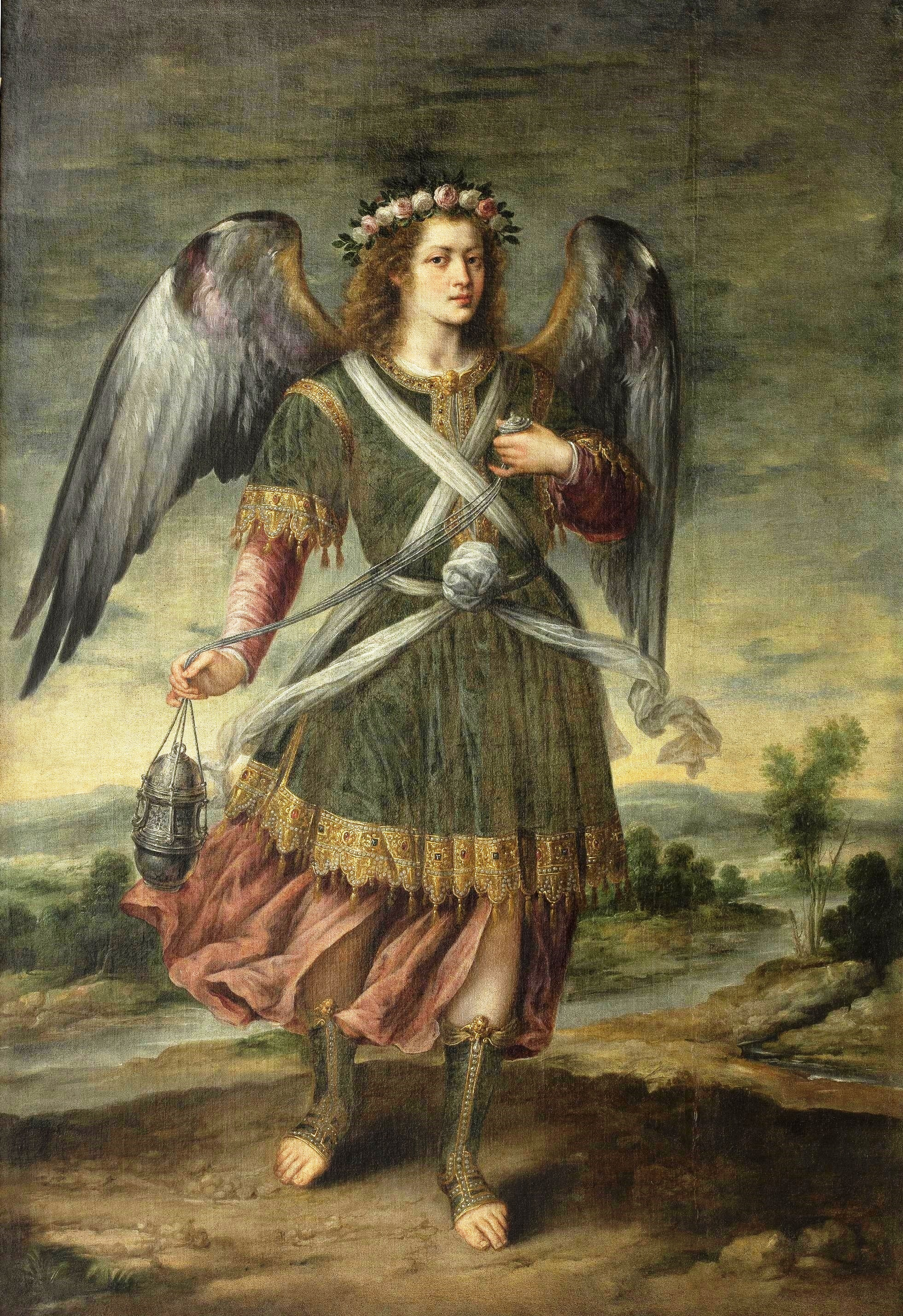
- Archangel Selaphiel Carrying a Thurible by Bartolomé Román, 17th century.

Archangel, Saint
- Venerated in: Eastern Orthodox Church, Byzantine Catholic Churches
- Attributes: Prayer, thurible

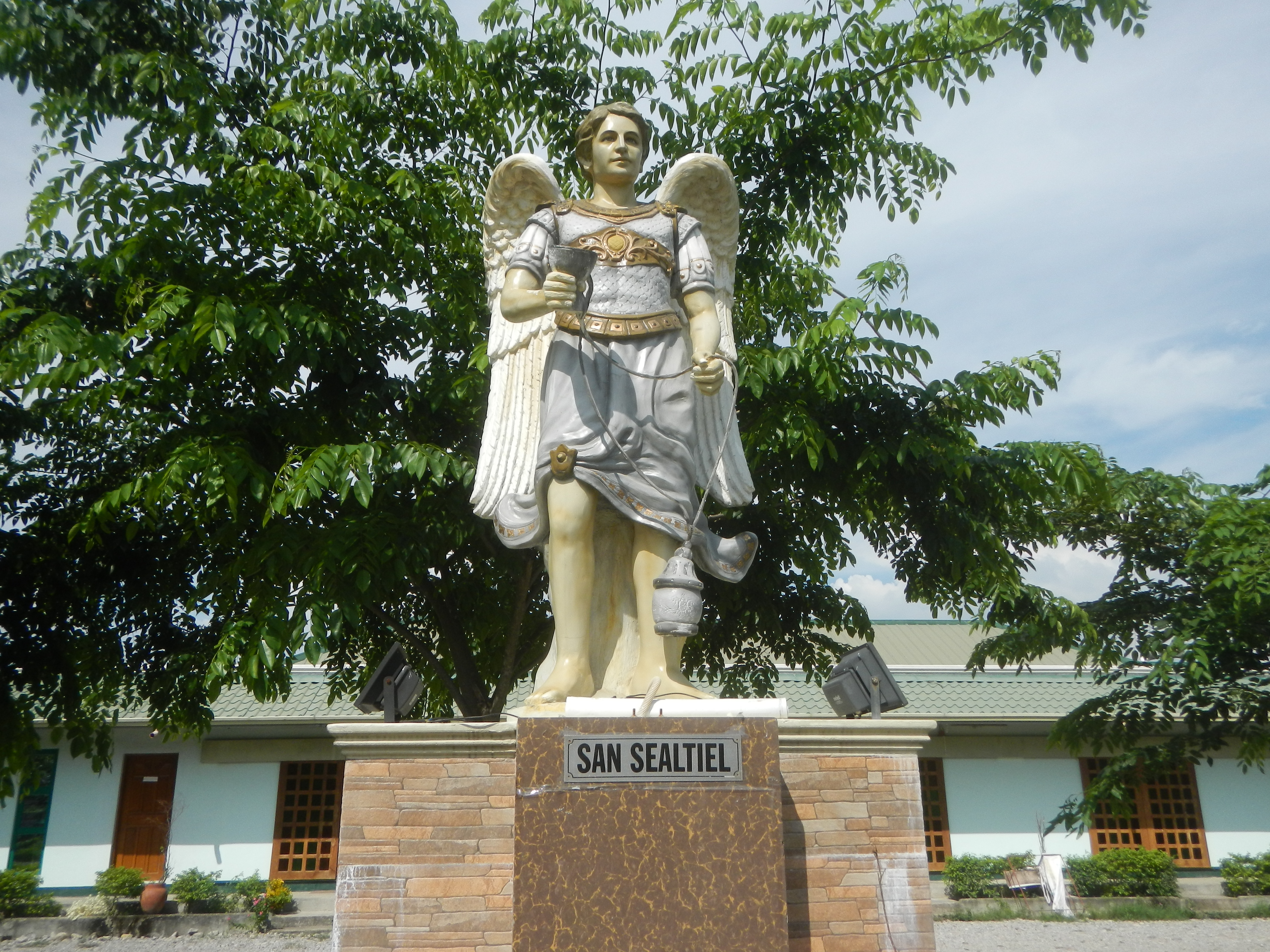
Statue of Saint Sealtiel

Saint Selaphiel the Archangel or Saint Sealtiel, Selatiel, or Selathiel (Hebrew: שְׁאַלְתִּיאֵל Šəʾaltīʾēl, Tiberian: Šăʾaltīʾēl, "I have asked God") is one of the archangels in Eastern Orthodox traditions.

== Biblical References ==
Selaphiel appears in verse 31:6 of the 6th century apocryphal Christian text The Conflict of Adam and Eve, which describes how God sends him and Suriyel to help rescue Adam and Eve from Satan’s deception, commanding Selaphiel “to bring them down from the top of the high mountain and to take them to the Cave of Treasures.”

Some Christian traditions consider Selaphiel as the angel in Revelation 8:3–4 in the New Testament, who presents the prayers of people on Earth to God in heaven: "Another angel, who had a golden censer, came and stood at the altar. He was given much incense to offer, with the prayers of all God’s people, on the golden altar in front of the throne. The smoke of the incense, together with the prayers of God’s people, went up before God from the angel’s hand."

== Patronage ==
Selaphiel is often seen as the Patron Saint of prayer and worship for members of the Eastern Orthodox Church. In some Orthodox traditions, he is said to help people interpret dreams, break addictions, protect children, preside over exorcisms, and rule over music in heaven. Orthodox Christians will seek his help if their prayer is suffering from distractions, inattentiveness, or coldness. In tradition, he is depicted with a thurible.

== Iconography ==
When depicted in iconography by himself or with individual characteristics, he is shown in an attitude of humble prayer, with downcast eyes and arms crossed over his breast. He is also sometimes seen kneeling with incense in a thurible, praying. Prayer is considered his special attribute.

== See also ==
- List of angels in theology
- "The World of The Angels". Transfiguration of Our Lord Russian Orthodox Church.
