= October 26 =

October 26 this year in various calendars
- Monday, 26 October 2026
Akan	Fodwo
Armenian	8 Trē 1476
Aztec	Atlcahualo 4, 4 Ōlīn
Babylonian	13 Tashritu, 2337 SE
Balinese pawukon	Luang, Pepet, Pasah, Jaya, Umanis, Tungleh, Coma of Watugunung, Guru, Nohan, Raksasa
Bengali	10 Kartik, BS 1433
Chinese	Yin Water Rooster・Roof Mansion; Fire Horse Year, Month 9, Day 17 (Shuangjiang, 12 days until Lidong)
Common Era	26 October 2026 CE
Coptic	16 Paopi, AM 1743
Egyptian	13 Phamenoth, 2775 NE
Ethiopian	16 Ṭeqemt, 2019 Amätä Məhrät
French Republican	Décade I, Quartidi de Brumaire de l'Année 235 de la République
Gregorian	26 October, AD 2026
Hebrew	15 Cheshvan, AM 5787
Hindu	Aśvinī・Vajra; Solar: 9 Kārtika, 1948 SE; Lunisolar: Pūrṇimā, Śukla pakṣa of Āśvina, 2083 VE; Rāudra・5127 KY・1,872,874
Icelandic	Mánudagur, 3 Gormánuður 2026
Islamic	14 Jumada al-awwal, AH 1448 (using tabular method)
ISO week date	2026-W44-1
Japanese	16 Nagatsuki, Reiwa 8 (Sōkō, 12 days until Rittō)
Julian	13 October, AD 2026 (AM 7535)
Julian day	2461340
Korean	16 Gaedal, 4359 DE
Maya	13.0.14.0.17; 10 Zac, 4 Caban
Roman	ante diem III Idus Octobres, MMDCCLXXIX AUC
Solar Hijri	4 Aban, SH 1405
Tibetan	15 tha skar, me pho rta 2153 or 1772 or 1000

<<	October					>>
Su	Mo	Tu	We	Th	Fr	Sa
				1	2	3
4	5	6	7	8	9	10
11	12	13	14	15	16	17
18	19	20	21	22	23	24
25	26	27	28	29	30	31
2026

October 26 in recent years
2026 (Monday)
2025 (Sunday)
2024 (Saturday)
2023 (Thursday)
2022 (Wednesday)
2021 (Tuesday)
2020 (Monday)
2019 (Saturday)
2018 (Friday)
2017 (Thursday)

October 26 is the 299th day of the year (300th in leap years) in the Gregorian calendar; 66 days remain until the end of the year.

== Events ==
=== Pre-1600 ===
- 1185 – The Uprising of Asen and Peter begins on the feast day of St. Demetrius of Thessaloniki and ends with the creation of the Second Bulgarian Empire.
- 1341 – The Byzantine civil war of 1341–1347 formally begins with the proclamation of John VI Kantakouzenos as Byzantine Emperor.
- 1377 – Tvrtko I is crowned the first king of Bosnia.
- 1520 – Charles V is crowned as Holy Roman Emperor.
- 1597 – Imjin War: Korean Admiral Yi Sun-sin routs the Japanese Navy of 300 ships with only 13 ships at the Battle of Myeongnyang.

=== 1601–1900 ===
- 1640 – The Treaty of Ripon is signed, restoring peace between Covenanter Scotland and King Charles I of England.
- 1689 – General Enea Silvio Piccolomini of Austria burns down Skopje to prevent the spread of cholera; he dies of the disease soon afterwards.
- 1774 – American Revolution: The First Continental Congress adjourns in Philadelphia.
- 1813 – War of 1812: A combined force of British regulars, Canadian militia and Mohawks defeat the United States Army in the Battle of the Chateauguay.
- 1825 – The Erie Canal opens, allowing direct passage from the Hudson River to Lake Erie.
- 1859 – The Royal Charter Storm kills at least eight hundred people in the British Isles.
- 1860 – Unification of Italy: The Expedition of the Thousand ends when Giuseppe Garibaldi presents his conquests to King Victor Emmanuel of Sardinia.
- 1863 – The Football Association is founded.
- 1871 – Liberian President Edward James Roye is deposed in a coup d'état.
- 1881 – Wyatt Earp and Doc Holliday participate in the Gunfight at the O.K. Corral in Tombstone, Arizona.
- 1890 – Malleco Viaduct in Chile, at the time "the highest railroad bridge in the world", is inaugurated by President José Manuel Balmaceda.
- 1892 – Ida B. Wells publishes Southern Horrors: Lynch Law in All Its Phases.

=== 1901–present ===
- 1905 – King Oscar II recognizes the dissolution of the union between Norway and Sweden.
- 1909 – Japanese occupation of Korea: An Jung-geun assassinates Japan's Resident-General of Korea.
- 1912 – First Balkan War: The Ottomans lose the cities of Thessaloniki and Skopje.
- 1917 – World War I: Brazil declares war on the Central Powers.
- 1918 – World War I: Erich Ludendorff, quartermaster-general of the Imperial German Army, is dismissed by Kaiser Wilhelm II for refusing to cooperate in peace negotiations.
- 1936 – The first electric generator at Hoover Dam goes into full operation.
- 1937 – Nazi Germany begins expulsions of 18,000 Polish Jews.
- 1942 – World War II: In the Battle of the Santa Cruz Islands during the Guadalcanal Campaign, one U.S. aircraft carrier is sunk and another carrier is heavily damaged, while two Japanese carriers and one cruiser are heavily damaged.
- 1944 – World War II: The Battle of Leyte Gulf ends with an overwhelming American victory.
- 1947 – Partition of India: The Maharaja of Kashmir and Jammu signs the Instrument of Accession with India, beginning the Indo-Pakistani War of 1947–1948 and the Kashmir conflict.
- 1955 – After the last Allied troops have left the country, and following the provisions of the Austrian Independence Treaty, Austria declares that it will never join a military alliance.
- 1955 – Ngô Đình Diệm proclaims himself as President of the newly created Republic of Vietnam.
- 1956 – Hungarian Revolution: In the towns of Mosonmagyaróvár and Esztergom, Hungarian secret police forces massacre civilians. As rebel strongholds in Budapest hold, fighting spreads throughout the country.
- 1958 – Pan American Airways makes the first commercial flight of the Boeing 707 from New York City to Paris.
- 1967 – Mohammad Reza Pahlavi crowns himself Emperor of Iran.
- 1968 – Space Race: The Soyuz 3 mission achieves the first Soviet space rendezvous.
- 1977 – Ali Maow Maalin, the last natural case of smallpox, develops a rash in Somalia. The WHO and the CDC consider this date to be the anniversary of the eradication of smallpox, the most spectacular success of vaccination.
- 1979 – Park Chung Hee, President of South Korea, is assassinated by Korean CIA head Kim Jae-gyu.
- 1985 – The Australian government returns ownership of Uluru to the local Pitjantjatjara Aboriginals.
- 1989 – China Airlines Flight 204 crashes after takeoff from Hualien Airport in Taiwan, killing all 54 people on board.
- 1991 – Three months after the end of the Ten-Day War, the last soldier of the Yugoslav People's Army leaves the territory of the Republic of Slovenia.
- 1994 – Jordan and Israel sign a peace treaty.
- 1995 – Mossad agents assassinate Palestinian Islamic Jihad leader Fathi Shaqaqi in his hotel in Malta.
- 1995 – An avalanche hits the Icelandic village of Flateyri, destroying 29 homes and burying 45 people, and killing 20.
- 1999 – The United Kingdom's House of Lords votes to end the right of most hereditary peers to vote in Britain's upper chamber of Parliament.
- 2000 – A wave of protests forces Robert Guéï to step down as president after the Ivorian presidential election.
- 2001 – The United States passes the USA PATRIOT Act into law.
- 2002 – Approximately 50 Chechen terrorists and 150 hostages die when Russian special forces troops storm a theater building in Moscow, which had been occupied by the terrorists during a musical performance three days before.
- 2003 – The Cedar Fire, the third-largest wildfire in California history, kills 15 people, consumes 250,000 acres (1,000 km^{2}), and destroys 2,200 homes around San Diego.
- 2004 – Rockstar Games releases Grand Theft Auto: San Andreas for the PlayStation 2 in North America, which sold 12 million units for the PS2, becoming the console's best-selling video game.
- 2012 – Microsoft made a public release of Windows 8 and made it available on new PCs.
- 2015 – A 7.5 magnitude earthquake strikes in the Hindu Kush mountain range in South Asia, killing 399 people and leaving 2,536 people injured.

== Births ==
=== Pre-1600 ===
- 1416 – Edmund Grey, 1st Earl of Kent, English politician, Lord High Treasurer (died 1490)
- 1427 – Sigismund, Archduke of Austria (died 1496)
- 1431 – Ercole I d'Este, Duke of Ferrara, Italian politician (died 1505)
- 1473 – Friedrich of Saxony, Grand Master of the Teutonic Knights (died 1510)
- 1483 – Hans Buchner, German Renaissance composer (died 1538)
- 1491 – Zhengde Emperor of China (died 1521)
- 1518 – John Basset, Devonshire gentleman (died 1541)
- 1529 – Anna of Hesse, princess of Hesse (died 1591)
- 1551 – Charlotte de Sauve, French courtesan (died 1617)
- 1556 – Ahmad Baba al Massufi, Malian academic (died 1627)
- 1564 – Hans Leo Hassler, German organist and composer (died 1612)

=== 1601–1900 ===
- 1609 – William Sprague, English-American settler, co-founded Charlestown, Massachusetts (died 1675)
- 1612 – Henry Wilmot, 1st Earl of Rochester (died 1658)
- 1673 – Dimitrie Cantemir, Moldavian geographer, historian, and philosopher (died 1723)
- 1684 – Kurt Christoph Graf von Schwerin, Prussian field marshal (died 1757)
- 1685 – Domenico Scarlatti, Italian harpsichord player and composer (died 1757)
- 1694 – Johan Helmich Roman, Swedish composer and academic (died 1758)
- 1747 – Ivan Mane Jarnović, Italian violinist and composer (died 1804)
- 1757 – Karl Leonhard Reinhold, Austrian philosopher and academic (died 1823)
- 1759 – Georges Danton, French lawyer and politician, French Minister of Justice (died 1794)
- 1768 – Eustachy Erazm Sanguszko, Polish general and politician (died 1844)
- 1794 – Konstantin Thon, Russian architect, designed the Grand Kremlin Palace and the Cathedral of Christ the Saviour (died 1881)
- 1795 – Nikolaos Mantzaros, Greek composer and theorist (died 1872)
- 1797 – Giuditta Pasta, Italian soprano (died 1865)
- 1799 – Margaret Agnes Bunn, Scottish actress (died 1883)
- 1800 – Helmuth von Moltke the Elder, Prussian field marshal (died 1891)
- 1802 – Miguel I of Portugal (died 1866)
- 1803 – Joseph Hansom, English architect and publisher, designed Birmingham Town Hall (died 1882)
- 1842 – Vasily Vereshchagin, Russian soldier and painter (died 1904)
- 1849 – Ferdinand Georg Frobenius, German mathematician and academic (died 1917)
- 1850 – Grigore Tocilescu, Romanian archaeologist and historian (died 1909)
- 1854 – C. W. Post, American businessman, founded Post Foods (died 1914)
- 1860 – Frank Eaton, American marshal and author (died 1958)
- 1865 – Benjamin Guggenheim, American businessman (died 1912)
- 1869 – Washington Luís, Brazilian lawyer and politician, 13th President of Brazil (died 1957)
- 1871 – Guillermo Kahlo, German-Mexican photographer (died 1941)
- 1873 – A. K. Fazlul Huq, Bangladeshi-Pakistani lawyer and politician, 5th Pakistani Minister of Interior (died 1962)
- 1873 – Thorvald Stauning, Danish union leader and politician, 24th Prime Minister of Denmark (died 1942)
- 1874 – Martin Lowry, English chemist and academic (died 1936)
- 1874 – Abby Aldrich Rockefeller, American philanthropist, founded the Museum of Modern Art (died 1948)
- 1876 – H.B. Warner, English actor (died 1958)
- 1878 – William Kissam Vanderbilt II, American motor racing enthusiast and yachtsman (died 1944)
- 1880 – Andrei Bely, Russian novelist, poet, and critic (died 1934)
- 1881 – Louis Bastien, French cyclist and fencer (died 1963)
- 1883 – Napoleon Hill, American philosopher and author (died 1970)
- 1883 – Paul Pilgrim, American runner (died 1958)
- 1884 – William Hogenson, American sprinter (died 1965)
- 1888 – Runar Schildt, Finnish author (died 1925)
- 1890 – Ganesh Shankar Vidyarthi, Indian journalist and politician (died 1931)
- 1893 – Miloš Crnjanski, Serbian poet and author (died 1977)
- 1894 – Florence Nagle, English trainer and breeder of racehorses (died 1988)
- 1899 – Judy Johnson, American baseball player and coach (died 1989)
- 1900 – Ibrahim Abboud, Sudanese politician and general, 1st President of Sudan (died 1983)
- 1900 – Karin Boye, Swedish poet and novelist (died 1941)

=== 1901–present ===
- 1902 – Beryl Markham, Kenyan horse trainer and author (died 1986)
- 1902 – Jack Sharkey, American boxer and referee (died 1994)
- 1902 – Henrietta Hill Swope, American astronomer and academic (died 1980)
- 1903 – Mahn Ba Khaing, Burmese politician (died 1947)
- 1905 – George Bernard Flahiff, Canadian cardinal (died 1989)
- 1906 – Primo Carnera, Italian boxer and actor (died 1967)
- 1909 – Ignace Lepp, French psychologist and author (died 1966)
- 1909 – Dante Quinterno, Argentinian author and illustrator (died 2003)
- 1910 – John Krol, American cardinal (died 1996)
- 1911 – Sid Gillman, American football player and coach (died 2003)
- 1911 – Mahalia Jackson, American singer (died 1972)
- 1911 – Sorley MacLean, Scottish poet and educator (died 1996)
- 1912 – Don Siegel, American director and producer (died 1991)
- 1913 – Charlie Barnet, American saxophonist, composer, and bandleader (died 1991)
- 1914 – Jackie Coogan, American actor and director (died 1984)
- 1915 – Ray Crawford, American race car driver, fighter ace, test pilot, and businessman (died 1996)
- 1915 – Joe Fry, English race car driver (died 1950)
- 1916 – François Mitterrand, French lawyer and politician, 21st President of France (died 1996)
- 1916 – Boyd Wagner, American colonel and pilot (died 1942)
- 1919 – Princess Ashraf of Iran (died 2016)
- 1919 – Frank Bourgholtzer, American journalist (died 2010)
- 1919 – Edward Brooke, American captain and politician, 47th Massachusetts Attorney General (died 2015)
- 1919 – Mohammad Reza Pahlavi, Shah of Iran (died 1980)
- 1920 – Sarah Lee Lippincott, American astronomer and academic (died 2019)
- 1921 – Joe Fulks, American basketball player (died 1976)
- 1922 – Madelyn Dunham, American grandmother of Barack Obama (died 2008)
- 1922 – Fred Wood, English actor (died 2003)
- 1923 – Robert Hinde, English zoologist and academic (died 2016)
- 1924 – Shaw Taylor, English actor and television host (died 2015)
- 1925 – Jan Wolkers, Dutch sculptor, painter, and author (died 2007)
- 1926 – Panos Gavalas, Greek singer (died 1988)
- 1927 – Warne Marsh, American saxophonist (died 1987)
- 1928 – Francisco Solano López, Argentinian illustrator (died 2011)
- 1929 – Neal Matthews Jr., American country/gospel singer (died 2000)
- 1931 – Suhaila Noah, Spouse of the Prime Minister of Malaysia (died 2014)
- 1933 – Takis Kanellopoulos, Greek director, producer, and screenwriter (died 1990)
- 1933 – Andrew P. O'Rourke, American judge and politician (died 2013)
- 1934 – Hot Rod Hundley, American basketball player and sportscaster (died 2015)
- 1934 – Hans-Joachim Roedelius, German keyboard player and producer
- 1935 – Mike Gray, American director, producer, and screenwriter (died 2013)
- 1935 – Gloria Conyers Hewitt, American mathematician and academic
- 1936 – Al Casey, American guitarist (died 2006)
- 1936 – Etelka Kenéz Heka, Hungarian writer, poet and singer (died 2024)
- 1936 – Shelley Morrison, American actress (died 2019)
- 1936 – György Pauk, Hungarian violinist and educator (died 2024)
- 1938 – Tom Meschery, Chinese-American basketball player
- 1940 – Eddie Henderson, American trumpet player and educator
- 1940 – John Horgan, Irish academic and politician
- 1941 – Steven Kellogg, American author and illustrator
- 1941 – Charlie Landsborough, English singer-songwriter and guitarist
- 1942 – Bob Hoskins, English actor, singer, and director (died 2014)
- 1942 – Milton Nascimento, Brazilian singer-songwriter and guitarist
- 1942 – Zdenko Runjić, Croatian songwriter and producer (died 2004)
- 1942 – Jonathan Williams, English race car driver and pilot (died 2014)
- 1944 – Jim McCann, Irish singer and guitarist (died 2015)
- 1945 – Pat Conroy, American author (died 2016)
- 1945 – Demetris Th. Gotsis, Greek poet and author (died 2021)
- 1945 – Nancy Davis Griffeth, American computer scientist and academic
- 1945 – Jaclyn Smith, American actress and producer
- 1946 – Kevin Barron, English electrician and politician
- 1946 – Keith Hopwood, English singer-songwriter, guitarist, and producer
- 1946 – Pat Sajak, American journalist, actor, and game show host
- 1946 – Holly Woodlawn, Puerto Rican actress and author (died 2015)
- 1947 – Ricardo Asch, Argentinian gynecologist and endocrinologist
- 1947 – Ian Ashley, German-English race car driver
- 1947 – Hillary Clinton, American lawyer and politician,United States Secretary of State and First Lady of the United States
- 1947 – Reg Empey, Northern Irish businessman and politician, Lord Mayor of Belfast
- 1947 – Trevor Joyce, Irish poet and scholar
- 1947 – Kenzo Kitakata, Japanese author
- 1948 – Toby Harrah, American baseball player and coach
- 1949 – Antonio Carpio, Filipino lawyer and jurist, Senior Associate Justice of the Supreme Court of the Philippines
- 1949 – Steve Rogers, American baseball player
- 1949 – Kevin Sullivan, American wrestler and booker (died 2024)
- 1951 – Bootsy Collins, American singer-songwriter and bass player
- 1951 – Tommy Mars, American keyboard player
- 1951 – Julian Schnabel, American painter, director, and screenwriter
- 1952 – Bobby Bandiera, American singer-songwriter and guitarist
- 1952 – Edward Garnier, English lawyer and politician, Solicitor General for England and Wales
- 1952 – Andrew Motion, English poet and author
- 1952 – David Was, American singer-songwriter and producer
- 1953 – Roger Allam, British actor
- 1953 – Tim Hely Hutchinson, English publisher
- 1953 – Joe Meriweather, American basketball player and coach (died 2013)
- 1953 – Keith Strickland, American guitarist and songwriter
- 1953 – AAMS Arefin Siddique, Bangladeshi academic administrator (died 2025)
- 1954 – Vasilis Hatzipanagis, Greek footballer
- 1954 – Adam Mars-Jones, English author and critic
- 1954 – D. W. Moffett, American actor and director
- 1954 – James Pickens Jr., American actor
- 1956 – Stephen Gumley, Australian engineer and businessman
- 1956 – Rita Wilson, American actress and producer
- 1957 – Bob Golic, American football player and radio host
- 1958 – Shaun Woodward, English journalist and politician, Secretary of State for Northern Ireland
- 1959 – Paul Farmer, American anthropologist and physician (died 2022)
- 1959 – Evo Morales, Bolivian soldier and politician, 80th President of Bolivia
- 1960 – Patrick Breen, American actor
- 1961 – Uhuru Kenyatta, Kenyan politician, 4th President of Kenya
- 1961 – Gerald Malloy, American lawyer and politician
- 1961 – Dylan McDermott, American actor
- 1961 – Joey Salceda, Filipino politician
- 1962 – Cary Elwes, English actor and producer
- 1962 – Jack Morelli, American comic book professional and author
- 1963 – Tom Cavanagh, Canadian actor and producer
- 1963 – Ted Demme, American actor, director, and producer (died 2002)
- 1963 – Natalie Merchant, American singer-songwriter and pianist
- 1963 – Craig Shakespeare, English football player (Walsall, West Bromwich Albion) and manager (Leicester City) (died 2024)
- 1964 – Kikka Sirén, Finnish pop/schlager singer (died 2005)
- 1965 – Kelly Rowan, Canadian actress and producer
- 1965 – Ken Rutherford, New Zealand cricketer
- 1966 – Sverre Gjørvad, Norwegian drummer and composer
- 1966 – Masaharu Iwata, Japanese keyboard player and composer
- 1966 – Steve Valentine, Scottish actor and magician
- 1966 – Jeanne Zelasko, American journalist and sportscaster
- 1967 – Douglas Alexander, Scottish lawyer and politician, former Minister of State for Europe
- 1967 – Keith Urban, Australian-American singer-songwriter and guitarist
- 1968 – Miyuki Imori, Japanese actress and singer
- 1970 – Dian Bachar, American actor, director, and screenwriter
- 1970 – Lisa Ryder, Canadian actress
- 1971 – Jim Butcher, American author
- 1971 – Rosemarie DeWitt, American actress
- 1971 – Audley Harrison, English boxer
- 1971 – Ronnie Irani, English cricketer
- 1971 – Anthony Rapp, American actor and singer
- 1972 – Matsuko Deluxe, Japanese journalist and author
- 1972 – Daniel Elena, Monegasque race car driver
- 1972 – Raveena Tandon, Indian actress, producer, and former model
- 1973 – Austin Healey, English rugby player and sportscaster
- 1973 – Seth MacFarlane, American voice actor, singer, director, producer, and screenwriter
- 1973 – Taka Michinoku, Japanese wrestler and trainer
- 1973 – Róbert Petrovický, Slovak ice hockey player
- 1976 – Florence Kasumba, Ugandan-German actress
- 1976 – Miikka Kiprusoff, Finnish ice hockey player
- 1977 – Jon Heder, American actor and producer
- 1977 – Marisha Pessl, American author
- 1978 – Sari Abacha, Nigerian footballer (died 2013)
- 1978 – Jimmy Aggrey, English footballer and actor
- 1978 – Eva Kaili, Greek journalist and politician
- 1978 – Antonio Pierce, American football player and coach
- 1978 – CM Punk, American wrestler, mixed martial artist, and actor
- 1978 – Dave Zastudil, American football player
- 1979 – Movsar Barayev, Chechen terrorist (died 2002)
- 1980 – Cristian Chivu, Romanian footballer
- 1980 – Nick Collison, American basketball player
- 1980 – Claire Cooper, English actress
- 1980 – Koichi Watanabe, Japanese kick-boxer
- 1981 – Sam Brown, American actor, producer, and screenwriter
- 1981 – Martina Schild, Swiss skier
- 1981 – Guy Sebastian, Malaysian-Australian singer-songwriter
- 1981 – Chou Ssu-Chi, Taiwanese baseball player
- 1982 – Nicola Adams, English boxer
- 1982 – Adam Carroll, Irish race car driver
- 1983 – Francisco Liriano, Dominican baseball player
- 1983 – Dmitri Sychev, Russian footballer
- 1983 – Luke Watson, South African rugby player
- 1984 – Sasha Cohen, American figure skater
- 1984 – Adriano Correia, Brazilian footballer
- 1984 – Mathieu Crépel, French snowboarder
- 1984 – Jefferson Farfán, Peruvian footballer
- 1984 – Amanda Overmyer, American singer-songwriter
- 1985 – Andrea Bargnani, Italian basketball player
- 1985 – Kafoumba Coulibaly, Ivorian footballer
- 1985 – Monta Ellis, American basketball player
- 1985 – Kieran Read, New Zealand rugby player
- 1986 – Ibor Bakar, French footballer
- 1986 – Jakub Rzeźniczak, Polish footballer
- 1986 – Marco Ruben, Argentinian footballer
- 1986 – Schoolboy Q, German-American rapper
- 1987 – Abudramae Bamba, Ivorian footballer
- 1987 – Shawn Lauvao, American football player
- 1988 – Nosliw Rodríguez, Venezuelan politician
- 1988 – Greg Zuerlein, American figure skater
- 1989 – Dre Kirkpatrick, American football player
- 1989 – Emil Sayfutdinov, Russian motorcycle racer
- 1990 – Mark Swanepoel, South African rugby player
- 1991 – Riho Iida, Japanese model and actress
- 1992 – Joseph Cramarossa, Canadian hockey player
- 1993 – Sergey Karasev, Russian basketball player
- 1994 – Waqa Blake, Fijian rugby league player
- 1994 – Allie DeBerry, American model and actress
- 1995 – Yuta, Japanese singer
- 1996 – Rebecca Tunney, English gymnast
- 1997 – Rhenzy Feliz, American actor and singer
- 2002 – Lee Eunsang, South Korean singer
- 2004 – Patrick Dorgu, Danish footballer

== Deaths ==
=== Pre-1600 ===
- 664 – Cedd, English monk and bishop (born 620)
- 760 – Cuthbert, archbishop of Canterbury
- 899 – Alfred the Great, English king (born 849)
- 930 – Li Qi, chancellor of Later Liang (born 871)
- 1111 – Gómez González, Castilian nobleman and military leader
- 1440 – Gilles de Rais, French lord (born c. 1405)
- 1555 – Olympia Fulvia Morata, Italian-German scholar and educator (born 1526)
- 1580 – Anna of Austria, Queen of Spain (born 1549)

=== 1601–1900 ===
- 1609 – Matsudaira Tadayori, Japanese samurai and daimyō (born 1582)
- 1631 – Michael Maestlin, German astronomer and mathematician (born 1550)
- 1633 – Horio Tadaharu, Japanese daimyō (born 1596)
- 1671 – Sir John Gell, 1st Baronet, English politician (born 1593)
- 1675 – William Sprague, English settler, co-founded Charlestown, Massachusetts (born 1609)
- 1686 – John Egerton, 2nd Earl of Bridgewater, English captain and politician, Lord Lieutenant of Buckinghamshire (born 1623)
- 1717 – Catherine Sedley, Countess of Dorchester (born 1657)
- 1751 – Philip Doddridge, English minister and hymn-writer (born 1702)
- 1764 – William Hogarth, English painter and engraver (born 1697)
- 1773 – Amédée-François Frézier, French mathematician, engineer, and explorer (born 1682)
- 1803 – Granville Leveson-Gower, 1st Marquess of Stafford, English politician, Lord President of the Council (born 1721)
- 1806 – John Graves Simcoe, English general and politician, 1st Lieutenant Governor of Upper Canada (born 1752)
- 1817 – Nikolaus Joseph von Jacquin, Dutch-Austrian chemist and botanist (born 1727)
- 1864 – William T. Anderson, American captain (born 1838)
- 1866 – John Kinder Labatt, Irish-Canadian brewer, founded the Labatt Brewing Company (born 1803)
- 1871 – Robert Anderson (Union officer), American general (born 1805)
- 1890 – Carlo Collodi, Italian journalist and author (born 1826)
- 1896 – Paul-Armand Challemel-Lacour, French philosopher, academic, and politician, French Minister of Foreign Affairs (born 1827)
- 1897 – John J. Robison, American politician in Michigan (born 1824)

=== 1901–present ===
- 1902 – Elizabeth Cady Stanton, American activist (born 1815)
- 1909 – Itō Hirobumi, Japanese samurai and politician, Prime Minister of Japan (born 1841)
- 1919 – Akashi Motojiro, Japanese general (born 1864)
- 1927 – Jūkichi Yagi, Japanese poet (born 1898)
- 1930 – Waldemar Haffkine, Russian-Swiss physician and microbiologist (born 1860)
- 1930 – Harry Payne Whitney, American businessman and horse breeder (born 1872)
- 1931 – Charles Comiskey, American baseball player and manager (born 1859)
- 1932 – Margaret Brown, American philanthropist and activist (born 1867)
- 1937 – Józef Dowbor-Muśnicki, Polish general (born 1867)
- 1941 – Arkady Gaidar, Russian journalist and author (born 1904)
- 1943 – Aurel Stein, Hungarian-English archaeologist and academic (born 1862)
- 1944 – Princess Beatrice of the United Kingdom (born 1857)
- 1944 – Hiroyoshi Nishizawa, Japanese lieutenant and pilot (born 1920)
- 1944 – William Temple, English archbishop and theologian (born 1881)
- 1945 – Aleksey Krylov, Russian mathematician and engineer (born 1863)
- 1945 – Paul Pelliot, French sinologist and explorer (born 1878)
- 1946 – Ioannis Rallis, Greek lawyer and politician, Prime Minister of Greece (born 1878)
- 1947 – Edwin Savage, English priest and author (born 1862)
- 1949 – Lionel Halsey, English admiral and courtier (born 1872)
- 1952 – Hattie McDaniel, American actress and singer (born 1893)
- 1956 – Walter Gieseking, French-German pianist and composer (born 1895)
- 1957 – Gerty Cori, Czech-American biochemist and physiologist, Nobel Prize laureate (born 1896)
- 1957 – Nikos Kazantzakis, Greek philosopher, author, and playwright (born 1883)
- 1960 – Toshizō Nishio, Japanese general (born 1881)
- 1961 – Sadae Inoue, Japanese general (born 1886)
- 1962 – Louise Beavers, American actress (born 1902)
- 1963 – Elizabeth Gunn, New Zealand pediatrician (born 1879)
- 1965 – Sylvia Likens, American murder victim (born 1949)
- 1966 – Alma Cogan, English singer (born 1932)
- 1972 – Igor Sikorsky, Ukrainian-American engineer and academic, founded Sikorsky Aircraft (born 1889)
- 1973 – Semyon Budyonny, Marshal of the Soviet Union (born 1883)
- 1974 – Bidia Dandaron, Russian author and educator (born 1914)
- 1976 – Deryck Cooke, English musicologist and author (born 1919)
- 1978 – Alexander Gerschenkron, Ukrainian-American historian, critic, and academic (born 1904)
- 1979 – Park Chung Hee, South Korean general and politician, 3rd President of South Korea (born 1917)
- 1984 – Gus Mancuso, American baseball player and coach (born 1905)
- 1986 – Jackson Scholz, American runner (born 1897)
- 1989 – Charles J. Pedersen, American chemist and academic, Nobel Prize laureate (born 1904)
- 1991 – Sherry Hawco, Canadian gymnast (born 1964)
- 1993 – Oro, Mexican wrestler (born 1971)
- 1994 – Wilbert Harrison, American singer and guitarist (born 1929)
- 1995 – Wilhelm Freddie, Danish painter and sculptor (born 1909)
- 1995 – Gorni Kramer, Italian bassist, songwriter, and bandleader (born 1913)
- 1998 – Kenkichi Iwasawa, Japanese mathematician and academic (born 1917)
- 1999 – Hoyt Axton, American singer-songwriter, guitarist, and actor (born 1938)
- 1999 – Eknath Easwaran, Indian-American author and educator (born 1910)
- 2001 – Hüseyin Hilmi Işık, Turkish scholar and academic (born 1911)
- 2002 – Jacques Massu, French general (born 1908)
- 2002 – Sally Hoyt Spofford, American ornithologist (born 1914)
- 2004 – Bobby Ávila, Mexican baseball player and politician (born 1924)
- 2005 – Keith Parkinson, American illustrator (born 1958)
- 2005 – George Swindin, English footballer and manager (born 1914)
- 2006 – Tillman Franks, American bassist and songwriter (born 1920)
- 2006 – Pontus Hultén, Swedish art collector and curator (born 1924)
- 2007 – Nicolae Dobrin, Romanian footballer and manager (born 1947)
- 2007 – Friedman Paul Erhardt, German-American chef and television host (born 1943)
- 2007 – Arthur Kornberg, American biochemist and academic, Nobel Prize (born 1918)
- 2008 – Tony Hillerman, American journalist, author, and educator (born 1925)
- 2008 – Delmar Watson, American actor and photographer (born 1926)
- 2009 – Teel Bivins, American lawyer and politician, 18th United States Ambassador to Sweden (born 1947)
- 2009 – Yoshirō Muraki, Japanese production designer and art director(born 1924)
- 2009 – George Naʻope, American singer and dancer (born 1928)
- 2009 – Troy Smith, American businessman, founded Sonic Drive-In (born 1922)
- 2010 – Glen Little, American clown (born 1925)
- 2010 – Mbah Maridjan, Indonesian spiritual leader (born 1927)
- 2010 – Romeu Tuma, Brazilian police officer and politician (born 1931)
- 2011 – Jona Senilagakali, Fijian physician and politician, 7th Prime Minister of Fiji (born 1929)
- 2012 – Mac Ahlberg, Swedish-Italian director, screenwriter, and cinematographer (born 1931)
- 2012 – Arnold Greenberg, American businessman, co-founded Snapple (born 1932)
- 2012 – John M. Johansen American architect, designed the Morris A. Mechanic Theatre (born 1916)
- 2012 – Alan Kirschenbaum, American director, producer, and screenwriter (born 1961)
- 2012 – Björn Sieber, Austrian skier (born 1989)
- 2012 – Alan Stretton, Australian general (born 1922)
- 2013 – Ritva Arvelo, Finnish actress, director, and screenwriter (born 1921)
- 2013 – Ron Davies, Welsh photographer (born 1921)
- 2013 – Doug Ireland, American journalist and activist (born 1946)
- 2013 – Al Johnson, American singer-songwriter and producer (born 1948)
- 2013 – Andries Maseko, South African footballer (born 1955)
- 2013 – Gabriel of Komana (born 1946)
- 2014 – Vic Allen, English sociologist, economist, and historian (born 1923)
- 2014 – Mo Collins, American football player and coach (born 1976)
- 2014 – Germain Gagnon, Canadian ice hockey player (born 1942)
- 2014 – Senzo Meyiwa, South African footballer (born 1987)
- 2014 – Brian Moore, Australian rugby league player (born 1944)
- 2014 – Jeff Robinson, American baseball player (born 1961)
- 2014 – Gordy Soltau, American football player and sportscaster (born 1925)
- 2014 – Oscar Taveras, Dominican baseball player (born 1992)
- 2015 – Willis Carto, American activist and theorist (born 1926)
- 2015 – Leo Kadanoff, American physicist and academic (born 1937)
- 2015 – Giuseppe Nazzaro, Italian-Syrian bishop and theologian (born 1937)
- 2017 – Ali Ashraf Darvishian, Iranian novelist, short story writer and academic. (born 1941)
- 2021 – Roh Tae-woo, South Korean general and politician, 6th President of South Korea (born 1932)
- 2025 – Björn Andrésen, Swedish actor and musician (born 1955)

== Holidays and observances ==
- Accession Day (Jammu and Kashmir, India)
- Angam Day (Nauru)
- Armed Forces Day (Benin)
- Christian feast day:
  - Alfred the Great (Catholic Church, Anglican Church, Eastern Orthodox Church)
  - Amandus of Strasbourg
  - Beóán (Bean) of Mortlach
  - Blessed Celine Borzecka
  - Cedd
  - Cuthbert of Canterbury
  - Demetrius of Thessaloniki
  - Eadfrith of Leominster
  - Eata of Hexham
  - Pope Evaristus (Aristus)
  - Fulk of Pavia (Roman Catholic Church)
  - Philipp Nicolai, Johann Heermann and Paul Gerhardt (Lutheran Church)
  - Quadragesimus
  - Quodvultdeus
  - Rusticus of Narbonne
  - Witta (Albinus) of Büraburg
  - Eastern Orthodox liturgics
- National Day, celebrates the anniversary of the Declaration of Neutrality in 1955. (Austria)
- Intersex Awareness Day
