= October 26 (Eastern Orthodox liturgics) =

Day in the Eastern Orthodox liturgical calendar

Eastern Orthodox liturgical calendar
October 25	October 26	October 27
October 26 O.S. ≍ November 8 N.S. October 26 N.S ≍ October 13 O.S.

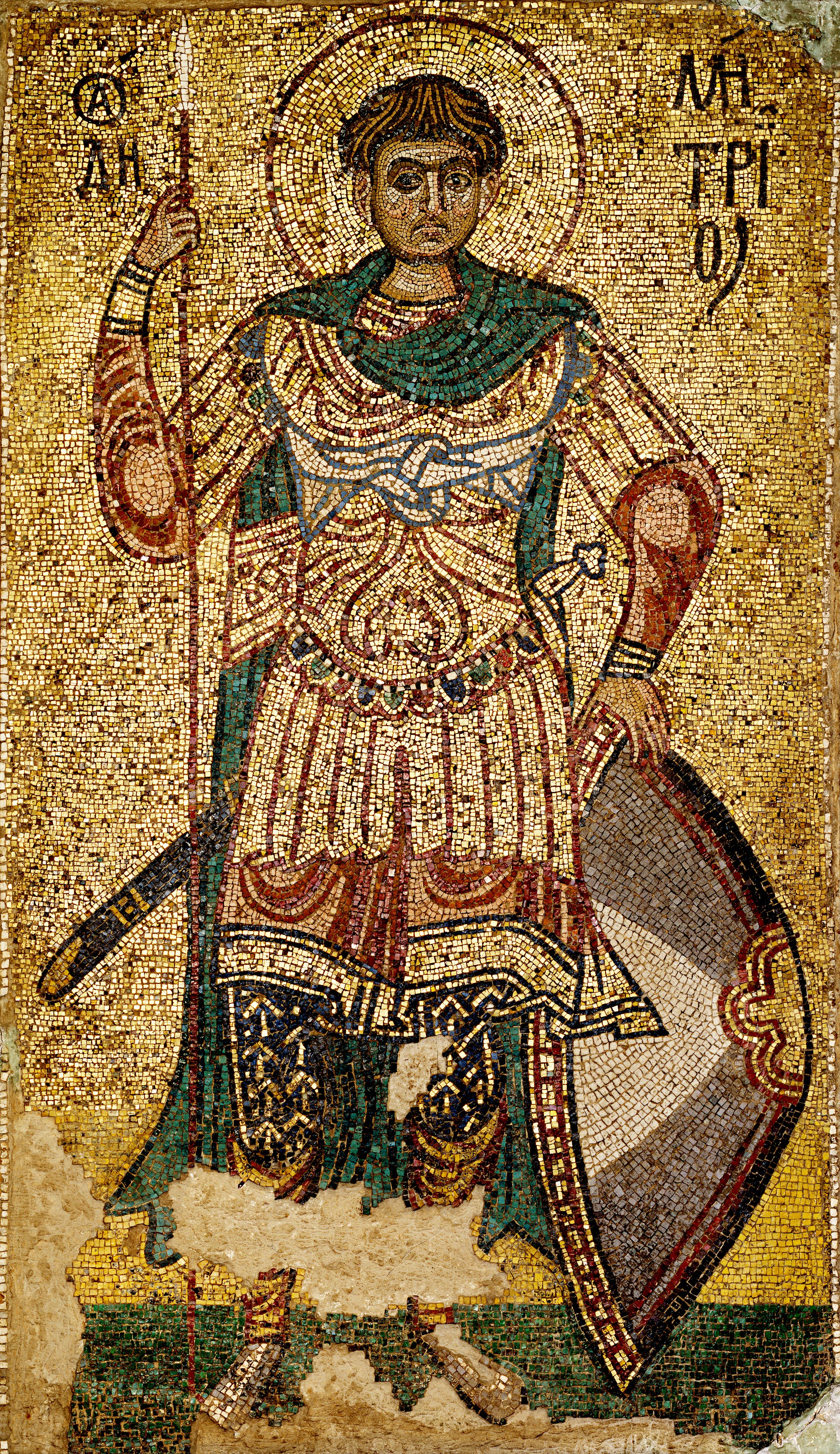
Holy and Glorious Great-martyr Demetrius the Myrrh-gusher of Thessaloniki. (St. Michael's Golden-Domed Monastery, c. 1108-1113.

October 26 in Eastern Orthodox liturgical calendars is a feast day and a day of commemoration of saints and martyrs. Although some Orthodox churches use the Revised Julian Calendar and others use the traditional Julian calendar, the fixed commemorations for their respective October 26 are broadly the same, no matter which calendar is used. (Note: Despite the dates being the same, the days to which they refer typically differ by 13 days. The notation Old Style or O.S. is sometimes used to indicate a date in the traditional Julian Calendar (the "Old Calendar"). The notation New Style or N.S. indicates a date in the Revised Julian calendar (the "New Calendar").)

== Saints ==
- Holy and Glorious Great-martyr Demetrius the Myrrh-gusher of Thessalonica (306) (Note: Name days celebrated today include: Demetrios, Demetris, Dimitris, Dimitrios, Jim, Mitros (Δημήτριος); Dimitra, Dimitria, Dimi, Demi (Δήμητρα).)
- Martyr Lupus (Lypp), slave of St. Demetrius of Thessalonica (306) (see also: August 23)
- Martyrs Artemidorus and Basil, by the sword.
- Martyr Leptina, dragged to death.
- Martyr Glycon, by the sword.
- Martyr Leontini.
- Saint Athanasius of Medikion Monastery (814)

== Pre-Schism Western saints ==
- Saint Evaristus, the fourth Pope of Rome and a martyr (c. 105) (Note: "AT Rome, in the time of the emperor Adrian, St. Evaristus, pope and martyr, who enriched the Church of God with his blood.")
- Saints Rogatian, a priest, and Felicissimus, a layman, of the church of Carthage in North Africa where they were martyred (256) (Note: "In Africa, the holy martyrs Rogatian, priest, and Felicissimus, who received the bright crown of martyrs, in the persecution of Valerian and Gallienus. They are mentioned by St. Cyprian in his epistle to the Confessors.") (Note: "S. Cyprian speaks of Rogatianus, the priest, and the faithful Felicissimus, who had witnessed a good confession for Christ. He does not call them martyrs, and therefore probably they did not suffer death, but persecution.)
- Saint Rusticus of Narbonne, a monk of Lérins who later became Bishop of Narbonne, he was present at the Third Oecumenical Council in Ephesus in 431 (c. 462) (Note: "At Narbonne, St. Rusticus, bishop and confessor, who flourished in the time of the emperors Valentinian and Leo.")
- Saints Alanus and Alorus, two Bishops of Quimper in Brittany (5th century)
- Saint Quadragesimus, a shepherd and subdeacon in Policastro in Italy who raised a man from the dead (c. 590) (Note: "Also, St. Quadragesimus, sub-deacon, who raised a dead man to life.")
- Saints Aneurin (or Gildas) and Gwinoc, father and son, both monks in Wales (6th century) (Note: "S. Gwynoc was grandson of Caw, prince of Strath-Clyde, who was driven from his principality by the invasion of the Picts and Scots, and took refuge in Anglesea. His father was Aneurin, also called Gildas, a famous poet. He fought in the bloody battle of Caltraeth, and describes it in his noble poem, the "Gododin." Another of his poems is the "Englynion y Misoedd." He was taken in the battle of Caltraeth and imprisoned, and composed the "Gododin" whilst in chains. On his release he retired to Wales and embraced the monastic life at Llancarvan. His son Gwynoc followed him, and became famous as a model of monastic virtues. The other sons of Aneurin were also saints, Cennydd, Madog, Dolgan, Nwython, and Dolgar.")
- Saint Gibitrudis, a nun at Faremoutiers-en-Brie in France (c. 655)
- Saint Cedd, Bishop of Lastingham (664) (Note: Brother of St Chad of Lichfield, he was a monk at Lindisfarne who enlightened the Midlands of England and later became Bishop of the East Saxons. He founded monasteries in Tilbury and Lastingham.) (see also: January 7)
- Saint Eadfrith of Leominster (Edfrid, Eadfrid), a priest from Northumbria in England, he preached in Mercia and founded a monastery in Leominster (c. 675)
- Saint Eata of Hexham, Bishop of Hexham and Abbot of Lindisfarne (686) (Note: A monk at Ripon in England. He later left it for Melrose in Scotland where he became abbot. After the Council of Whitby, he became Abbot of Lindisfarne. In 678 he became Bishop of Lindisfarne and later of Hexham.)
- Saint Gaudiosus of Salerno, Bishop of Salerno in Italy, his relics were venerated in Naples (7th century)
- Saint Humbert, a monk at Fritzlar and Büraburg in Germany (7th or 8th century)
- Saint Sigibald, Bishop of Metz in France (c. 740) (Note: He was a builder of monasteries, notably of Neuweiter and Saint-Avold.)
- Saint Cuthbert of Canterbury, a monk at Lyminge in Kent in England, he became Bishop of Hereford in c. 736 and the twelfth Archbishop of Canterbury in c. 740 (760)
- Saint Albinus (Witta), Bishop of Buraburg in Hesse (c. 760) (Note: Born in England, he set out with St Boniface to enlighten Germany. In 741 he was consecrated Bishop of Buraburg in Hesse.)
- Saint Alfred the Great, King of Wessex and all Orthodox England who defeated the Danish invaders and ensured the growth of the Church in England (899) (Note: A patron of sacred learning, Alfred the Great himself translated into English such works as the Dialogues of St Gregory the Great. His memory is held by many in great veneration as a patriot and model of Orthodox kingship.) (Note: "There are Orthodox Christians in our days who advocate declaring King Alfred of England (849-899) a Saint of the Church...We're left with three difficulties: (a) King Alfred at no time had an Orthodox cultus; (b) there are no surviving relics of him; and (c) so far there has been no sign from God that God wills him to be glorified by the Church on earth. Of course, anything can happen. Here is what can safely be said: To this day, King Alfred remains an unfadingly bright exemplar of pious Orthodox monarchy. And to this day English-speaking Orthodox Christians owe the rich flowering of tenth-century English Orthodox culture, great monuments of liturgy and sainthood and literature, to the vision, tenacity, and piety of Alfred.")
- Saint Beóán of Mortlach (Bean), Bishop of Mortlach in Banff in Scotland, he later preached in Aberdeen (c. 1012)
- Saint Adalgott, a monk at Einsiedeln and from 1012 Abbot of Dissentis, both of which monasteries are in Switzerland (1031)

== Post-Schism Orthodox saints ==
- Venerable Demetrius of Tsilibinsk (14th century)
- Saint Theophilus of the Kiev Caves, Archbishop of Novgorod (1482) (Note: See: (in Russian) Феофил (архиепископ Новгородский). Википе́дия. (Russian Wikipedia).)
- Venerable New Martyr Ioasaph, monk, of Mt. Athos, disciple of St. Niphon, Patriarch of Constantinople (1536)
- Venerable Saints Leontios and Leontios, of Mt. Athos.
- Saint Anthony, Bishop of Vologda (1588)
- Saint Demetrius of Basarabov in Bulgaria (1685) (Note: See: (in Russian) Димитрий Басарбовский. Википе́дия. (Russian Wikipedia).) (see also: October 27)

== Other commemorations ==
- Commemoration of the Great Earthquake at Constantinople in 740 (740)
- Translation of the holy icon (1149) of Great-martyr Demetrius the Myrrh-gusher of Thessalonica (306) from Thessaloniki to Constantinople.
- Translation of the relics (1971) of New Martyr George of Ioannina (1838) (Note: His feast day is on January 17.)
- Synaxis of the Holy Military Martyrs (2026) (Note: "The Synaxis of the Holy Military Martyrs was included in the calendar of the Romanian Orthodox Church, to be commemorated on 26 October; the Synod approved liturgical texts for the feast (Synaxarion, Troparion and Kontakion).") (Romanian Orthodox Church. See also: July 8 - Ecumenical Patriarchate.)
- Repose of Hieroschemamonk Nilus of Kryuchi (1924)
- Repose of Elder Ignatius the Bulgarian, of Mt. Athos (1927)
- Repose of Matushka Olga (A’rrsamquq) Michael of Kwethluk, Alaska (1979) (Note: She reposed on November 8, 1979 (≍ October 26 O.S.). Her feast day is October 27.)

== Icon gallery ==
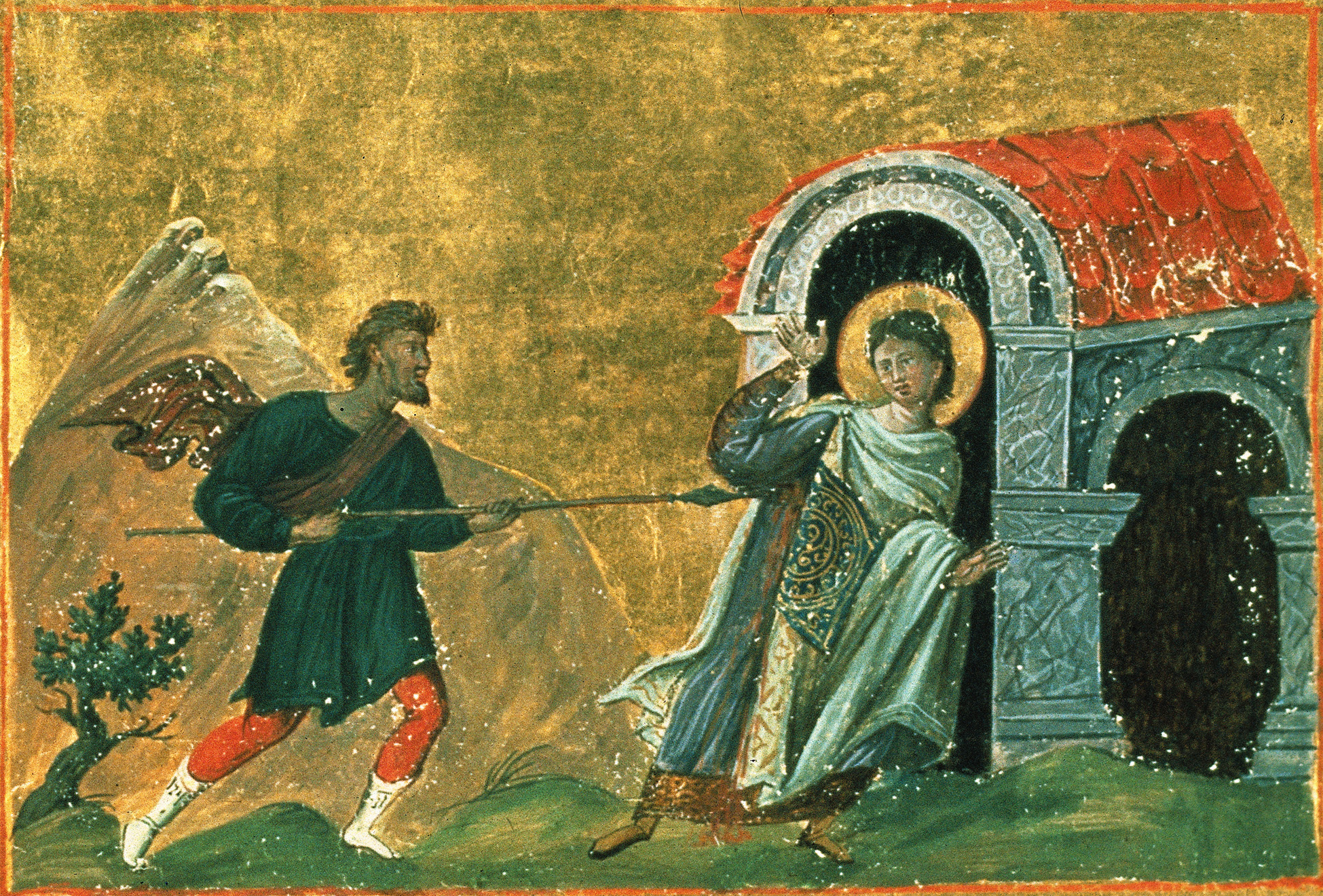
Great-martyr Demetrius of Thessaloniki.
(Menologion of Basil II, 10th century).

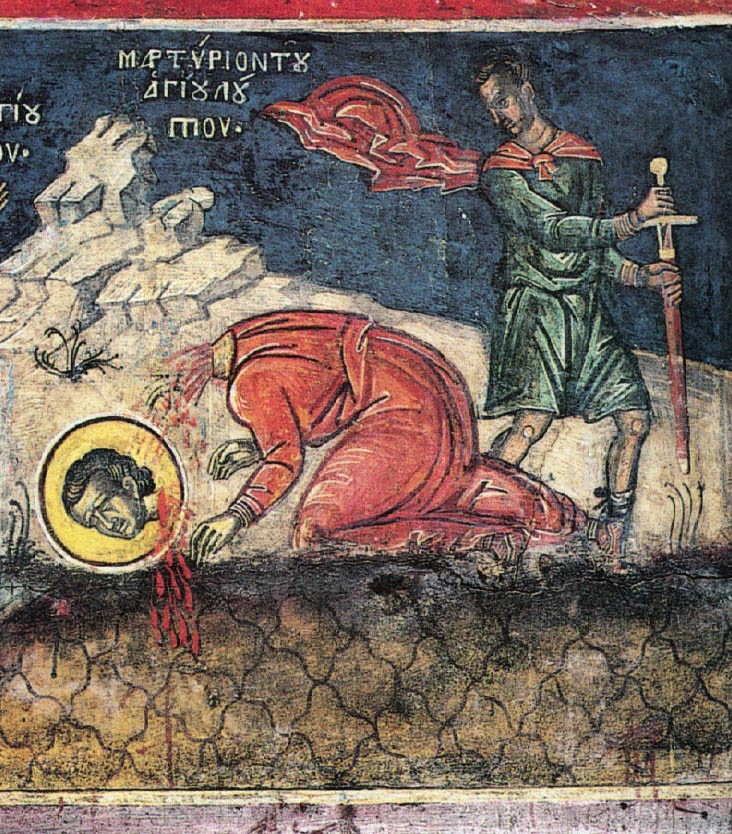
Martyrdom of St. Lupus of Thessaloniki.

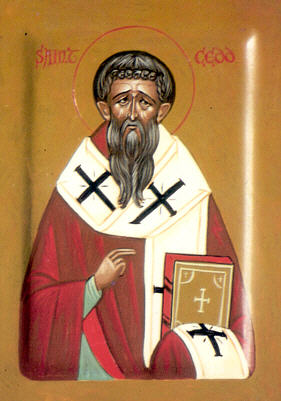
St. Cedd, Bishop of Lastingham.

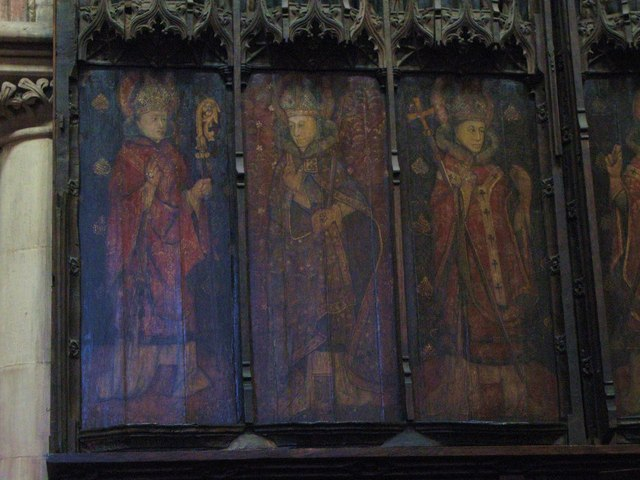
St. Eata of Hexham, Bishop of Hexham and Abbot of Lindisfarne.
(central image).

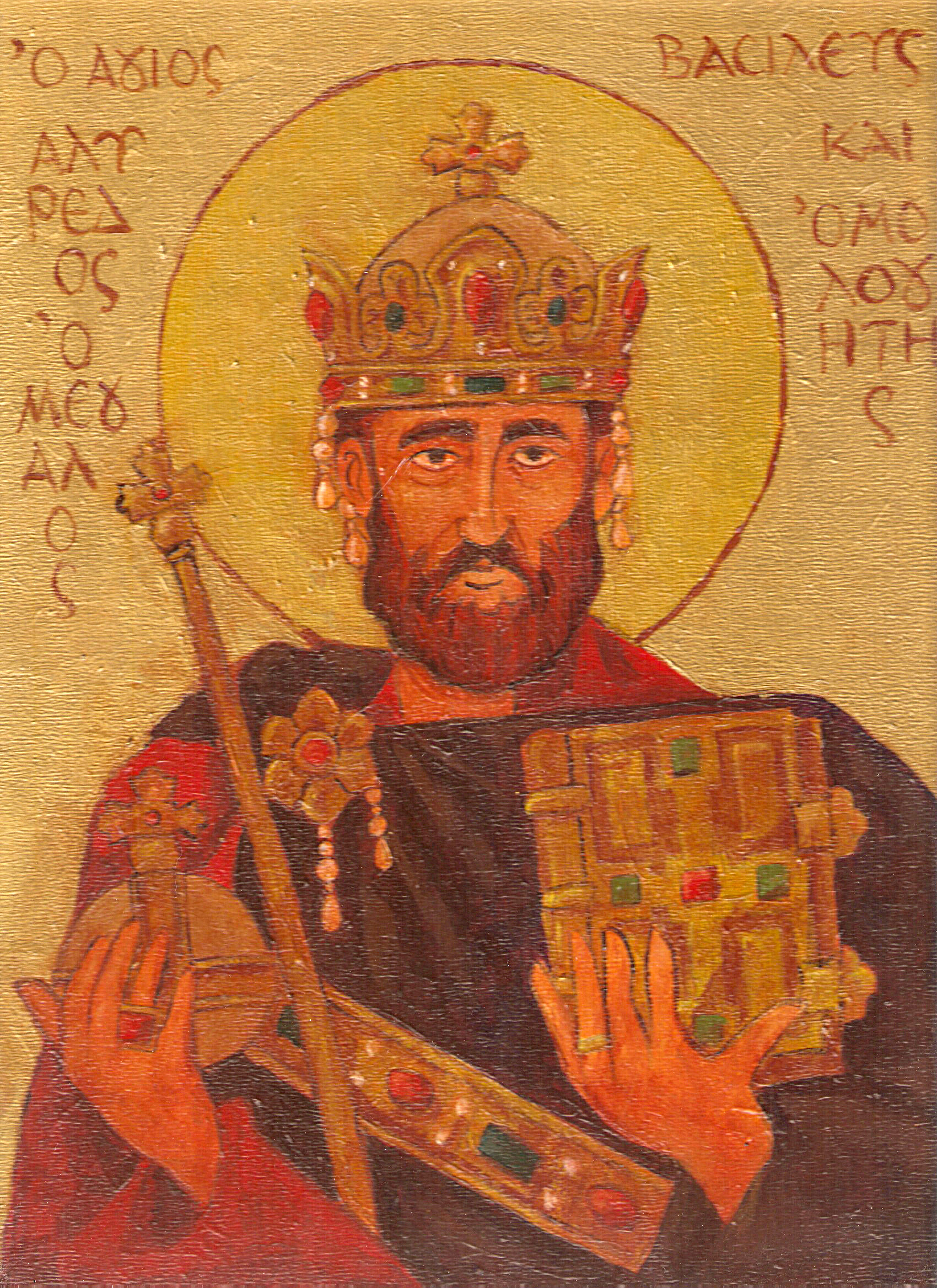
St. Alfred the Great, King of Wessex and all Orthodox England, and Confessor.

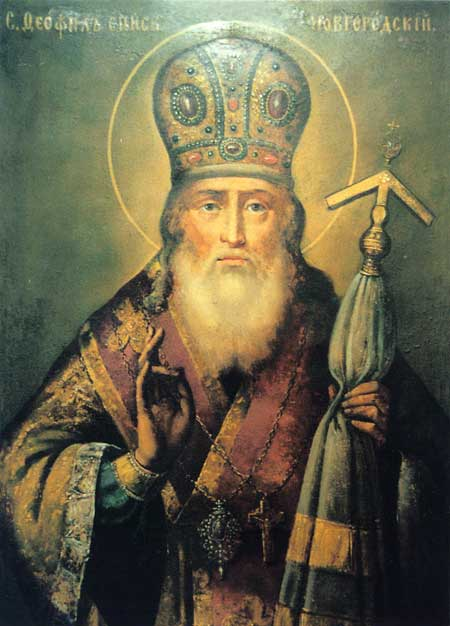
St. Theophilus of the Kiev Caves, Archbishop of Novgorod.

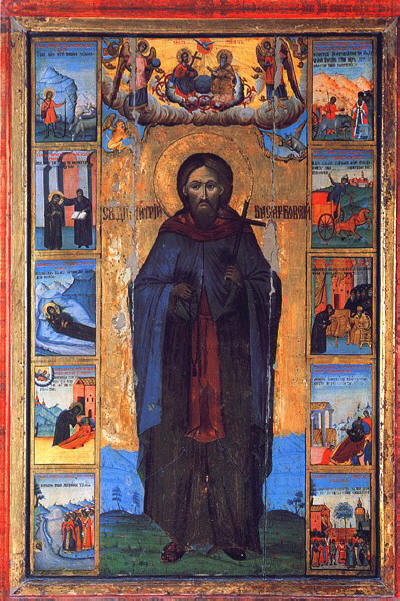
Saint Demetrius of Basarabov in Bulgaria.

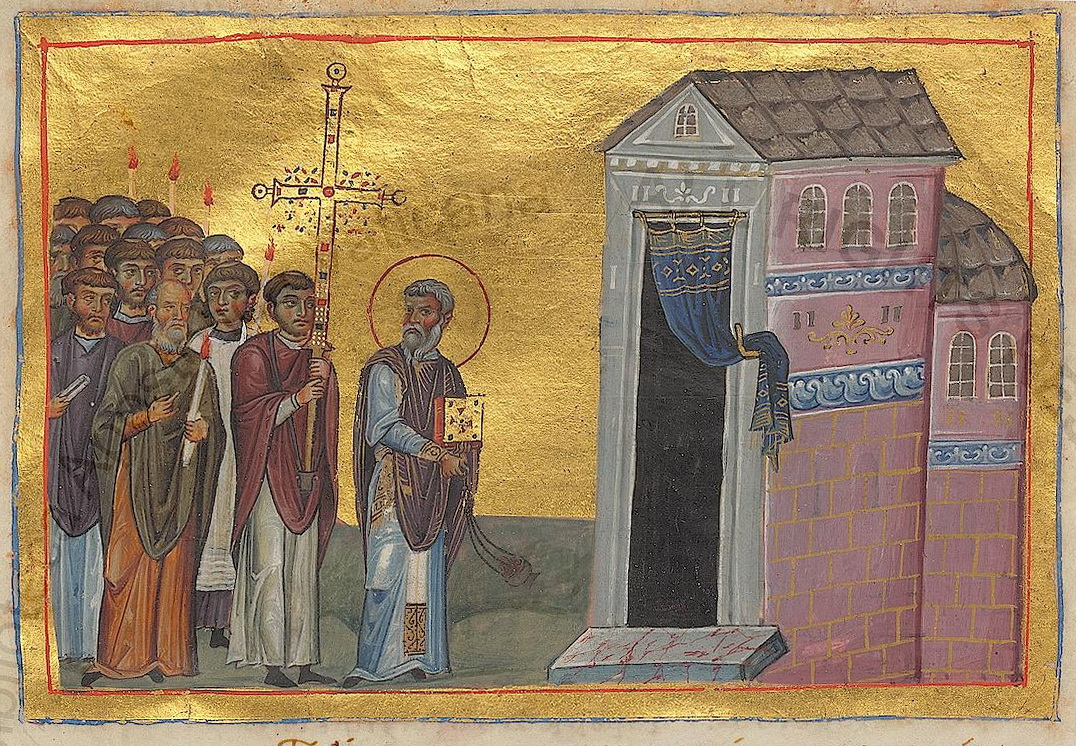
Commemoration of the Great Earthquake at Constantinople in 740.
(Menologion of Basil II, 10th century).

== Sources ==
- October 26 / November 8. Orthodox Calendar (PRAVOSLAVIE.RU).
- November 8 / October 26. HOLY TRINITY RUSSIAN ORTHODOX CHURCH (A parish of the Patriarchate of Moscow).
- October 26. OCA - The Lives of the Saints.
- The Autonomous Orthodox Metropolia of Western Europe and the Americas (ROCOR). St. Hilarion Calendar of Saints for the year of our Lord 2004. St. Hilarion Press (Austin, TX). p. 80.
- The Twenty-Sixth Day of the Month of October. Orthodoxy in China.
- October 26. Latin Saints of the Orthodox Patriarchate of Rome.
- The Roman Martyrology. Transl. by the Archbishop of Baltimore. Last Edition, According to the Copy Printed at Rome in 1914. Revised Edition, with the Imprimatur of His Eminence Cardinal Gibbons. Baltimore: John Murphy Company, 1916. pp. 330–331.
- Rev. Richard Stanton. A Menology of England and Wales, or, Brief Memorials of the Ancient British and English Saints Arranged According to the Calendar, Together with the Martyrs of the 16th and 17th Centuries. London: Burns & Oates, 1892. pp. 514–516.

Greek Sources

- Great Synaxaristes: (in Greek) 26 ΟΚΤΩΒΡΙΟΥ. ΜΕΓΑΣ ΣΥΝΑΞΑΡΙΣΤΗΣ.
- (in Greek) Συναξαριστής. 26 Οκτωβρίου. ECCLESIA.GR. (H ΕΚΚΛΗΣΙΑ ΤΗΣ ΕΛΛΑΔΟΣ).
- (in Greek) 26/10/2017. Ορθόδοξος Συναξαριστής.

Russian Sources

- (in Russian) 8 ноября (26 октября). Православная Энциклопедия под редакцией Патриарха Московского и всея Руси Кирилла (электронная версия). (Orthodox Encyclopedia - Pravenc.ru).
- (in Russian) 26 октября по старому стилю / 8 ноября по новому стилю. Русская Православная Церковь - Православный церковный календарь на 2016 год.
