= August 23 (Eastern Orthodox liturgics) =

Day in the Eastern Orthodox liturgical calendar

Eastern Orthodox liturgical calendar
August 22	August 23	August 24
August 23 O.S. ≍ September 5 N.S. August 23 N.S ≍ August 10 O.S.

An Eastern Orthodox cross

August 23 in Eastern Orthodox liturgical calendars is a feast day and a day of commemoration of saints and martyrs. Although some Orthodox churches use the Revised Julian Calendar and others use the traditional Julian calendar, the fixed commemorations for their respective August 23 are broadly the same, no matter which calendar is used. (Note: Despite the dates being the same, the days to which they refer typically differ by 13 days. The notation Old Style or O.S. is sometimes used to indicate a date in the traditional Julian Calendar (the "Old Calendar"). The notation New Style or N.S. indicates a date in the Revised Julian calendar (the "New Calendar").)

== Feasts ==
- Apodosis of the Dormition.

== Saints ==
- Hieromartyr Pothinus, Bishop of Lyon (c. 177)
- Hieromartyr Irenaeus, Bishop of Lyon (202)
- Hieromartyr Irenaeus, Bishop of Sirmium in Hungary (304) (see also: March 26)
- Martyrs Severus, Memnon the Centurion, and 38 others, of Thrace (c. 305) (see also: August 20)
- Martyr Lupus of Novae (306), slave of St. Demetrius of Thessaloniki. (Note: The service to St. Lupus is sung on Aug. 22.) (Note: "Also, St. Luppus, martyr, who, though a slave, enjoyed the liberty of Christ, and was likewise deemed worthy of the crown of martyrdom.") (see also: October 26)
- Saints Eutychius (540) and Florentius (547) of Nursia.
- Saint Callinicus, Patriarch of Constantinople (705)
- Saint Anthony, Bishop of Sardis (10th century)
- Saint Nicholas the Sicilian, ascetic of Mt. Neotaka in Euboea.

== Pre-Schism Western saints ==
- Martyrs Quiriacus, Maximus Archelaus and Companions (c. 235) (Note: "At Ostia, the holy martyrs Quiriacus, bishop, Maximus, priest, Archelaus, deacon, and their companions, who suffered under the prefect Ulpian, in the time of Alexander.")
- Martyrs Minervius, Eleazar and Companions, in Lyon in France - eight children are included in their number (3rd century) (Note: "At Lyon, the holy martyrs Minervus, and Eleazar with his eight sons.")
- Saint Tydfil, venerated in Merthyr Tydfil in Wales, where she was slain by the heathen (c. 480)
- Saint Victor of Vita (Victor Vitensis), born in Carthage in North Africa, he was either Bishop there or in Utica (c. 535)
- Saint Éogan of Ardstraw (c. 618) (Note: Born in Ireland, he preached abroad and then returned to Ireland, where he became first Bishop of Ardstraw in Tyrone.)
- Saints Flavian (Flavinian, Flavius) of Autun, the twenty-first Bishop of Autun in France (7th century)
- Saints Altigianus and Hilarinus, two monks killed by the Saracens at Saint-Seine in France (731)
- Martyrs Æbbe the Younger, Abbess of Coldingham Priory, Northumbria, and her companions (870) (Note: Born in England, she became Abbess of Coldingham, now in Scotland. This had been founded two centuries earlier by St Ebba the Elder. The Danes set fire to her convent and all the nuns perished.) (Note: "ST. EBBA, called the Younger, to distinguish her from St. Ebba, the foundress, was Abbess of Coldingham at the time of the terrible invasion of the pagan Danes, and presided over a large and fervent community of religious, amongst whom the Benedictine rule was already established. When news reached them that the hostile forces were near at hand, and that they were ruthlessly murdering all ecclesiastics and religious of both sexes, St. Ebba assembled her nuns in Chapter, and exhorted them, above all things, to take measures for the preservation of the precious treasure of their chastity. Saying this, she took a razor and unhesitatingly cut off her own upper lip with the nose, hoping to inspire the barbarians with horror at the sight. Her example was immediately followed with unflinching courage by all the sisters; so that when the Danes arrived, they were seized with' a panic at the bloody spectacle, and forthwith began to retreat. Their leaders, Hinguar and Hubba, in their rage and disappointment, then sent some of their followers to set fire to the monastery, and destroy the holy -inmates and their possessions in one common ruin.")

== Post-Schism Orthodox saints ==
- Saint Haralambos of Panagia Kalyviani convent (in the Heraklio Prefecture), the newly-revealed (1788) (Note: "In the days of the late Metropolitan Timothy of Gortyni and Arcadia, who came to the throne in 1956, when the courtyard of the Monastery was being fixed next to the old church, a grave was found from which a fragrance poured out and relics were discovered. Saint Haralambos then began to appear to many people in the village of Dafnes. Metropolitan Timothy built a church in honor of Saint Haralambos, and it was consecrated by Metropolitan Makarios of Gortyni and Arcadia on 9/29/2012.")

=== New martyrs and confessors ===
- New Hieromartyrs Ephraim (Kuznetsov), Bishop of Selenginsk, and John Vostorgov, Archpriest, of Moscow, and Martyr Nicholas Varzhansky (1918)
- New Hieromartyrs Paul Gaidai and John Karabanov, Priests (1937)

== Other commemorations ==
- Synaxis of Panagia Proussiotissa (Mother of God of Proussa) in Evrytania, Greece (c. 829–842) (Note: The Icon of Panagia Proussiotissa (Mother of God of Proussa) was re-discovered near Karpenissi in Greece, after it had been lost during its transportation in 829 AD from Asia Minor to the mainland of Greece to save it from iconoclasm, during the period of iconoclastic Byzantine Emperor Theophilos (829–842). According to holy tradition, this icon was painted by Saint Luke the Evangelist. The Monastery of Proussos in Karpenisi, Evrytania, Greece, was named after the Holy Icon of Panagia of Prousa. It was founded during this period on the site where the icon was re-discovered. Its feast day is 23 August (the Leavetaking of the Dormition of the Mother of God), and it is visited by crowds of pilgrims each year from 15 to 23 August to venerate the Icon of the All-Holy Mother of God of Prousa.)
- Mykhaylivska Icon of the Most Holy Theotokos.
- Repose of Abbot Ioannicius (Moroi) of Sihastria, Romania (1944)

== Icon gallery ==
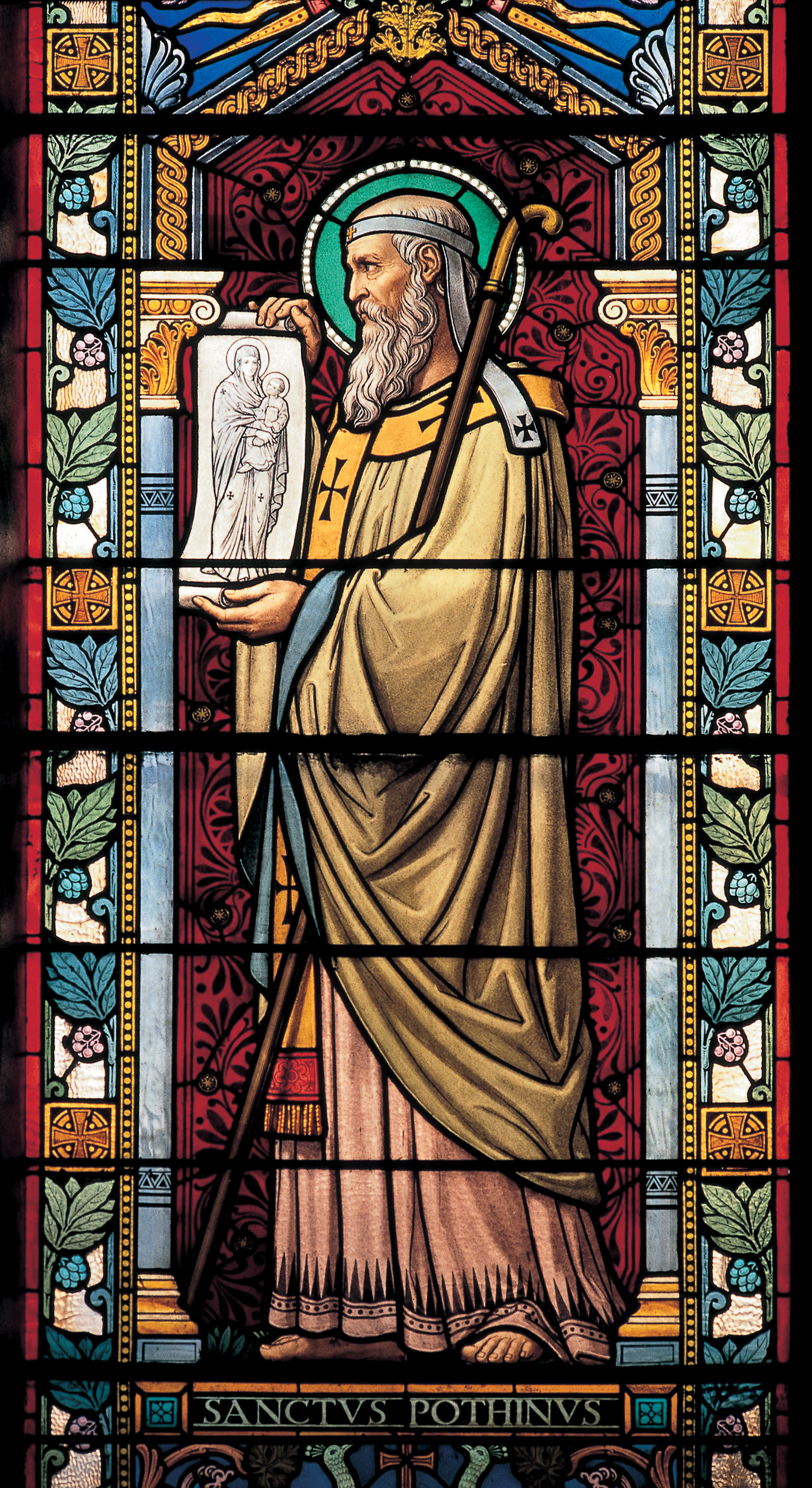
Hieromartyr Pothinus, Bishop of Lyon.

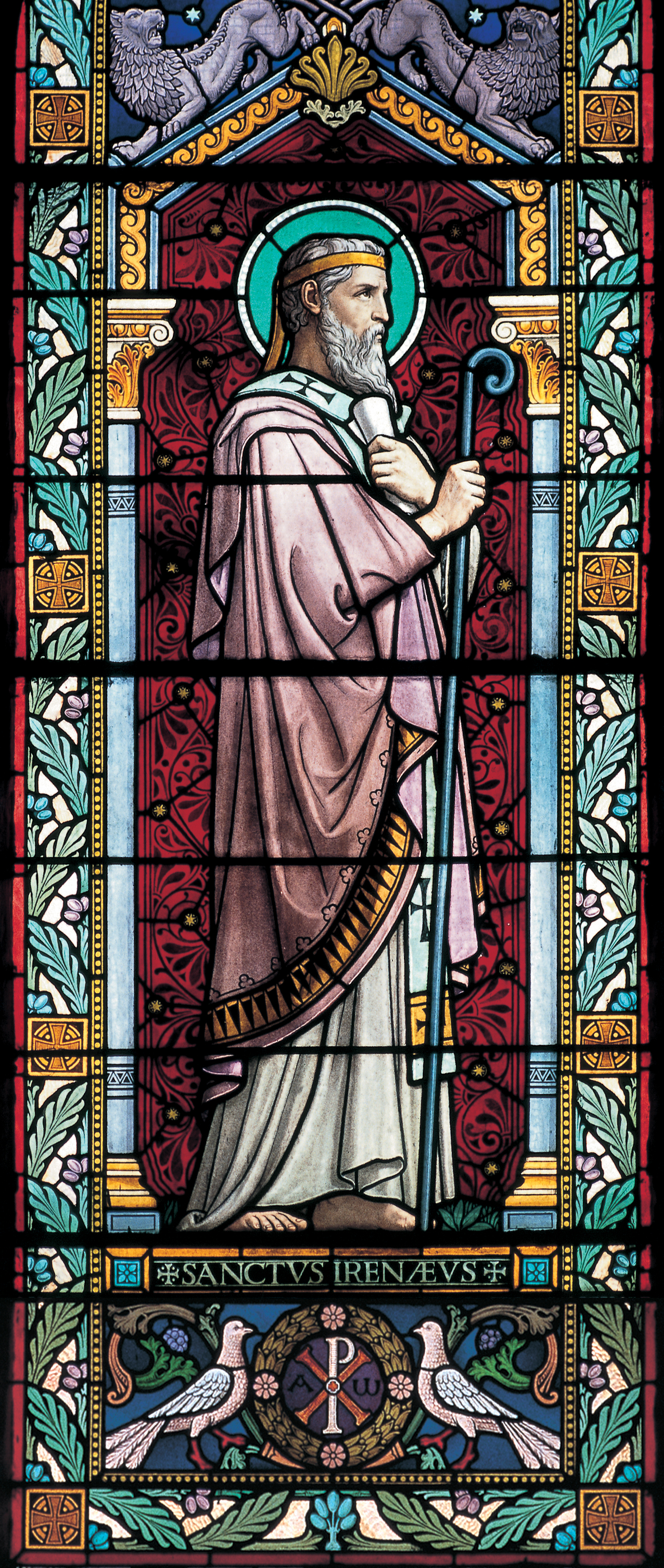
Hieromartyr Irenaeus, Bishop of Lyon.

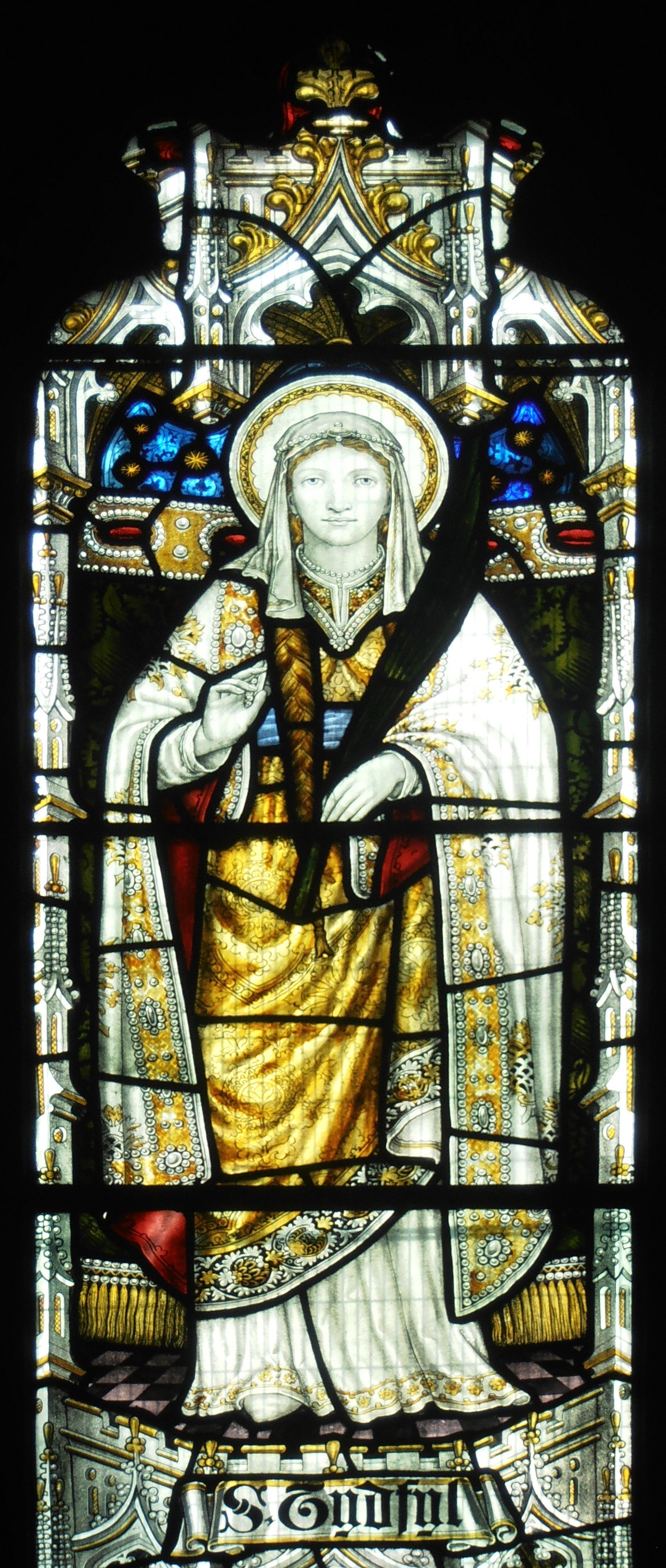
Saint Tydfil.

== Sources ==
- August 23 / September 5. Orthodox Calendar (PRAVOSLAVIE.RU).
- September 5 / August 23. Holy Trinity Russian Orthodox Church (A parish of the Patriarchate of Moscow).
- August 23. OCA - The Lives of the Saints.
- The Autonomous Orthodox Metropolia of Western Europe and the Americas (ROCOR). St. Hilarion Calendar of Saints for the year of our Lord 2004. St. Hilarion Press (Austin, TX). p. 62.
- The Twenty-Third Day of the Month of August. Orthodoxy in China.
- August 23. Latin Saints of the Orthodox Patriarchate of Rome.
- The Roman Martyrology. Transl. by the Archbishop of Baltimore. Last Edition, According to the Copy Printed at Rome in 1914. Revised Edition, with the Imprimatur of His Eminence Cardinal Gibbons. Baltimore: John Murphy Company, 1916. pp. 254–255.
- Rev. Richard Stanton. A Menology of England and Wales, or, Brief Memorials of the Ancient British and English Saints Arranged According to the Calendar, Together with the Martyrs of the 16th and 17th Centuries. London: Burns & Oates, 1892. pp. 410–411.

Greek Sources

- Great Synaxaristes: (in Greek) 23 ΑΥΓΟΥΣΤΟΥ. ΜΕΓΑΣ ΣΥΝΑΞΑΡΙΣΤΗΣ.
- (in Greek) Συναξαριστής. 23 Αυγούστου. ECCLESIA.GR. (H ΕΚΚΛΗΣΙΑ ΤΗΣ ΕΛΛΑΔΟΣ).

Russian Sources

- (in Russian) 5 сентября (23 августа). Православная Энциклопедия под редакцией Патриарха Московского и всея Руси Кирилла (электронная версия). (Orthodox Encyclopedia - Pravenc.ru).
