= Hijri era =

Era in the Islamic calendar

Today (at UTC+00)
- Monday, 9 November 2026
- Islamic: 28 Jumada al-awwal, AH 1448 (using tabular method)
- Solar Hijri: 18 Aban, SH 1405
Other calendars
Akan	Nkyidwo
Armenian	22 Trē 1476
Aztec	Atlcahualo 18, 5 Ozomahtli
Babylonian	27 Tashritu, 2337 SE
Balinese pawukon	Menga, Kajeng, Sri, Keliwon, Urukung, Coma of Landep, Sri, Erangan, Suka
Bengali	24 Kartik, BS 1433
Chinese	Yin Fire Pig・Exntended Net Mansion; Fire Horse Year, Month 10, Day 1 (Lidong, 13 days until Xiaoxue)
Common Era	9 November 2026 CE
Coptic	30 Paopi, AM 1743
Egyptian	27 Phamenoth, 2775 NE
Ethiopian	30 Ṭeqemt, 2019 Amätä Məhrät
French Republican	Décade II, Octidi de Brumaire de l'Année 235 de la République
Gregorian	9 November, AD 2026
Hebrew	29 Cheshvan, AM 5787
Hindu	Svātī・Ayuṣmān; Solar: 23 Kārtika, 1948 SE; Lunisolar: Amāvasyā, Kṛishna pakṣa of Āśvina, 2083 VE; Rāudra・5127 KY・1,872,888
Icelandic	Mánudagur, 17 Gormánuður 2026
ISO week date	2026-W46-1
Japanese	1 Kannazuki, Reiwa 8 (Rittō, 13 days until Shōsetsu)
Julian	27 October, AD 2026 (AM 7535)
Julian day	2461354
Korean	1 Dwaejidal, 4359 DE
Maya	13.0.14.1.11; 4 Ceh, 5 Chuen
Roman	ante diem VI Kalendas Novembres, MMDCCLXXIX AUC
Tibetan	30 tha skar, me pho rta 2153 or 1772 or 1000

The Hijri era (Arabic: التقويم الهجري, romanized: at-taqwīm al-hijrī) is the calendar era used to record dates in the Islamic world. Its epoch (start point of the era) is the year in which Muhammad and his followers migrated from Mecca to Yathrib (now Medina), in 622 CE. This event, known as the Hijrah, is commemorated in Islam for its role in the founding of the first Muslim community (ummah). Time in this era is measured by two principal calendars: the "Islamic" lunar Hijri calendar, which counts lunar years of 354 to 355 days, and the "Persian" solar Hijri calendar, which counts solar years of 365 to 366 days.

In the West, dates in the lunar Hijri calendar are denoted as AH (Latin: Anno Hegirae) or Hijri year (Arabic: سنة هجرية, romanized: sanat hijriyya, lit. 'in the year of the Hijra') in the style of the Christian (AD), Common (CE) and Jewish eras (AM) and can similarly be placed before (preferably) or after the date. In predominantly Muslim countries, it is also commonly abbreviated H ("Hijra") from its Arabic abbreviation hāʾ (هـ). Years prior to AH 1 are reckoned in English as BH ("Before the Hijra"), which follows the date. Dates in the solar Hijri calendar are denoted as SH. The current year since the Hijra is AH 1448 according to the lunar calendar (Note: calculated using the tabular Islamic calendar) and SH 1405 according to the solar calendar. The growing difference in numbering of currently 42–43 years arises because a lunar year is about eleven days shorter than a solar year.

The solar Hijri year corresponds closely with the Gregorian, but its year begins on the March equinox rather than on 1 January, so the era offset toggles between 622 years for almost three months and 621 years for over nine months. The beginning of the lunar Hijri year, on the other hand, moves earlier by at least ten days each solar year, because twelve lunar months amount to only 354 or 355 days.

The current Gregorian year 2026 CE corresponds to the Persian years SH 1404 – 1405 and to the Islamic years AH 1447 – 1448; conversely, SH 1405 and AH 1448 correspond to 2026 – 2027 CE. (Note: See List of Islamic years#Modern.) Some solar years cover a full lunar year and some days of adjacent years on both ends, e.g. 1976, 2008 and 2041 CE or 1380 SH. In 2034 CE, the solar and lunar Hijri years will begin within two days of each other.

== Definition ==
The Hijri era is calculated according to the Islamic lunar calendar, whose epoch (first year) is the year of Muhammad's Hijrah, and begins on the first day of the month of Muharram (equivalent to the Julian calendar date of July 16, 622 CE). (Note: This date is based on a reconstruction of the early Islamic calendar and, assuming that intercalation was performed before 10 AH, an earlier date in April is also possible.)

The date of the Hijrah itself did not form the Islamic New Year. Instead, the system continues the earlier ordering of the months, with the Hijrah occurring around the 8th day of Rabi al-Awwal, 66 days into the first year.

=== Shia view ===
Unlike Sunnis, Twelver Shias start the Hijri year with the month of the Hijra, Rabi' al-Awwal, rejecting that Muharram is the start of a new year. As a result of this, the dates of some events are described differently by one year. For example, Shias state that the Muharram-transpiring battle of Karbala occurred 60 years after the Hijra, while Sunnis state it to have occurred 61 years after.

In Shia Islam, the calendar year is entirely determined by solar observation or calculation. The first day of the new year is determined by the moment of the Northern hemisphere spring equinox. Therefore, the difference between lunar and solar Hijri era counts has grown to 42–43 years now.

== History ==
=== Predecessors ===
By the age of Muhammad, there was already an Arabian lunar calendar, with named months. Likewise, the years of its calendar used conventional names rather than numbers: for example, the year of the birth of Muhammad and of Ammar ibn Yasir (570 CE) was known as the "Year of the Elephant". The first year of the Hijra (622–623 CE) was named the "Permission to Travel" in this calendar.

=== Establishment ===
17 years after the Hijra, a complaint from Abu Musa Ashaari prompted the caliph Umar to abolish the practice of named years and to establish a new calendar era. Umar chose as epoch for the new Muslim calendar the hijrah, the emigration of Muhammad and 70 Muslims from Mecca to Medina. Tradition credits Othman with the successful proposal, simply continuing the order of the months that had already been established by Muhammad, beginning with Muharram, as there was no set order of months during the pre-Islamic era (Age of Ignorance – Jahiliya). Adoption of this calendar was then enforced by Umar.

The Ottoman/Turkish Rumi calendar used day and month of the Julian calendar from its 1 March 1840 AD (Gregorian 13 March) paired with the Hijri era for years, but started with 1256 AH (and kept the constant offset of 584 years thereafter) instead of retrofitting it to 1218 SH (i.e. 622 years offset), so its difference to the Persian count remained 38 years.

== Formula ==
Different approximate conversion formulas between the Gregorian (AD or CE) and the Islamic lunar calendars (AH) are possible:

AH = 1.030684 × (CE − 621.5643)
CE = 0.970229 × AH + 621.5643

or

AH = (CE − 622) × 33⁄32
CE = AH × 32⁄33 + 622

Given that the (lunar) Islamic New Year does not begin January 1 and that a lunar Hijri calendar year is about 11 days shorter than a Gregorian calendar year, (Note: As the mean duration of a tropical year is 365.24219 days, while the long-term average duration of a lunar year is 354.36707 days, the average lunar year is (365.24219 − 354.36707 ≈) 10.88149 days shorter than the average solar year, causing months of the Hijri calendar to advance about eleven days earlier relative to dates in the Gregorian calendar every calendar year. The precise number of days varies, depending on accumulated differences and potential for leap-years to happen at different times.) there is no direct correspondence between years of the two eras. A given Hijri year will usually fall in two successive Gregorian years. A CE year will always overlap two or occasionally three successive Hijri years. For example, the year 2008 CE maps to the last week of AH 1428, all of 1429, and the first few days of 1430. Similarly, the year 1976 CE corresponded with the last few days of AH 1395, all of 1396, and the first week of 1397.

The solar Hijri calendar year is almost exactly the same length as a Gregorian calendar year and, although it always begins at the March equinox, date conversion between the systems is trivial.

== See also ==
- Months (in every year)
  - Lunar Hijri calendar months
  - Solar Hijri calendar months
- Battle of Badr – First major battle in early Islam (624)
- Prophetic biography – Biographies of Muhammad
- Glossary of Islam
