= October 27 (Eastern Orthodox liturgics) =

Day in the Eastern Orthodox liturgical calendar

Eastern Orthodox liturgical calendar
October 26	October 27	October 28
October 27 O.S. ≍ November 9 N.S. October 27 N.S ≍ October 14 O.S.

An Eastern Orthodox cross

October 27 in Eastern Orthodox liturgical calendars is a feast day and a day of commemoration of saints and martyrs. Although some Orthodox churches use the Revised Julian Calendar and others use the traditional Julian calendar, the fixed commemorations for their respective October 27 are broadly the same, no matter which calendar is used. (Note: Despite the dates being the same, the days to which they refer typically differ by 13 days. The notation Old Style or O.S. is sometimes used to indicate a date in the traditional Julian Calendar (the "Old Calendar"). The notation New Style or N.S. indicates a date in the Revised Julian calendar (the "New Calendar").)

== Saints ==
- Saint Claudia Procula, wife of Pontius Pilate (1st century)
- Martyrs Capitolina and Eroteis, of Cappadocia (304) (Note: "In Cappadocia, the holy martyrs Capitolina, and Erotheides, her handmaid, who suffered under Diocletian.")
- Martyrs Mark of the island of Thasos and those with him (304)
- Martyr Nestor of Thessaloniki (306) (Note: Name days celebrated today include: Nestor (Νέστορας).)
- Martyrs Mabrianos and Valentine. (Note: Their memory is recorded in the Jerusalemitic Canonarion (p. 116), without any other details provided therein.)
- Saint Kyriakos II, Patriarch of Constantinople (606)

== Pre-Schism Western saints ==
- Saint Florentius, a martyr in Trois-Châteaux in Burgundy in France (3rd century) (Note: "At Tilchatel, St. Florentius, martyr.")
- Martyrs Vincent, Sabina and Christeta, martyrs in Avila in Spain (303) (Note: "At Avila, in Spain, the Saints Vincent, Sabina and Christeta, who were first stretched on the rack in such a manner that all their limbs were dislocated; then stones being laid on their heads, and their brains beaten out with heavy bars, they terminated their martyrdom under the governor Dacian.")
- Saint Gaudiosus of Naples, Bishop of Abitina in North Africa (c. 455) (Note: Exiled by the Arian Vandal King Genseric (440), he took refuge at Naples where he founded a monastery. The introduction of the Augustinian Rule into Naples is attributed to him as well as the introduction of some relics, including those of Saint Restituta.)
- Saint Namatius (Namace), ninth Bishop of Clermont in France (c. 462) (Note: He built the Cathedral there.)
- Saint Abbán (Eibbán, Moabba), founder of many monasteries, mostly in the south of Ireland (c. 520) (Note: A nephew of St Kevin, he founded many monasteries, mostly in the south of Ireland. His name is closely connected with Magh-Armuidhe or Adamstown in Wexford.)
- Saint Oran of Iona (Otteran, Odhran, Odran), monk of Iona Abbey (c. 563) (Note: An Abbot of Meath in Ireland, he went to Scotland with St Columba and was the first to repose on Iona. His feast is kept in Ireland and he is the main patron of Waterford.)
- Saint Desiderius of Auxerre, Bishop of Auxerre in France (c. 625)
- Saint Colman of Senboth-Fola (Colman Na Fiachrach), a disciple of St Aidan of Ferns, he was Abbot of Senboth-Fola (Seuboth-Folu, Seanboth-Colmain), near Ferns (c. 632) (Note: [Martyrologv of Tallacht. The Felire of Ængus, and other Irish Martyrologies, as Colman Na Fiachrach.] "There are ninety-five saints of this name in the Martyrology of Donegal. This Colman was of the family of Fiachra, and abbot of Seuboth-folu, in the diocese of Ferns, in Ireland (Probably Templeshanborough).")

== Post-Schism Orthodox saints ==
- Venerable Nestor the Chronicler, of the Kiev Caves (1114)
- Venerable Nestor the Unlettered (not the Chronicler), of the Far Kiev Caves (14th century)
- Venerable Demetrius of Basarabov in Bulgaria (13th century, or 1685) (Note: See: (in Romanian) Sfântul Dimitrie cel Nou. Wikipedia. (Romanian Wikipedia).) (see also: October 26)
- Saint Alexander (Okropiridze), Bishop of Guria and Mingrelia, Georgia (1907) (Note: See: (in Georgian) ალექსანდრე (ოქროპირიძე). ვიკიპედიაში. (Georgian Wikipedia).)
- Righteous Mother Olga Arrsamquq Michael of Kwethluk (Kuiggluk), Alaska, Tanqilria, Wonderworker, Matushka of All Alaska (1979)

=== New Martys and Confessors ===
- New Hieromartyr Sergius (Chernukhin), Abbot, of Danilov Monastery, Moscow (1942)

== Other commemorations ==
- Narrative about the Iberians, involving a certain ascetic woman who healed the sick, including their queen, converting many to Christ (c. 332) (Note: This narrative is recorded in the Synaxarion of Nicodemus the Hagiorite.)
- Uncovering of the relics (1539), in Pereyaslavl-Zalessky, of St. Andrew, Prince of Smolensk (1390)
- Repose of Hieroschemamonk Antiochus of Svir, disciple of Elder Theodore of Svir (1832)

== Icon gallery ==
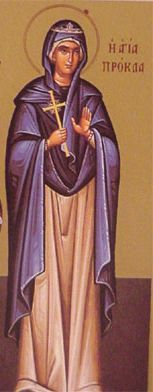
St. Claudia Procula, wife of Pontius Pilate.

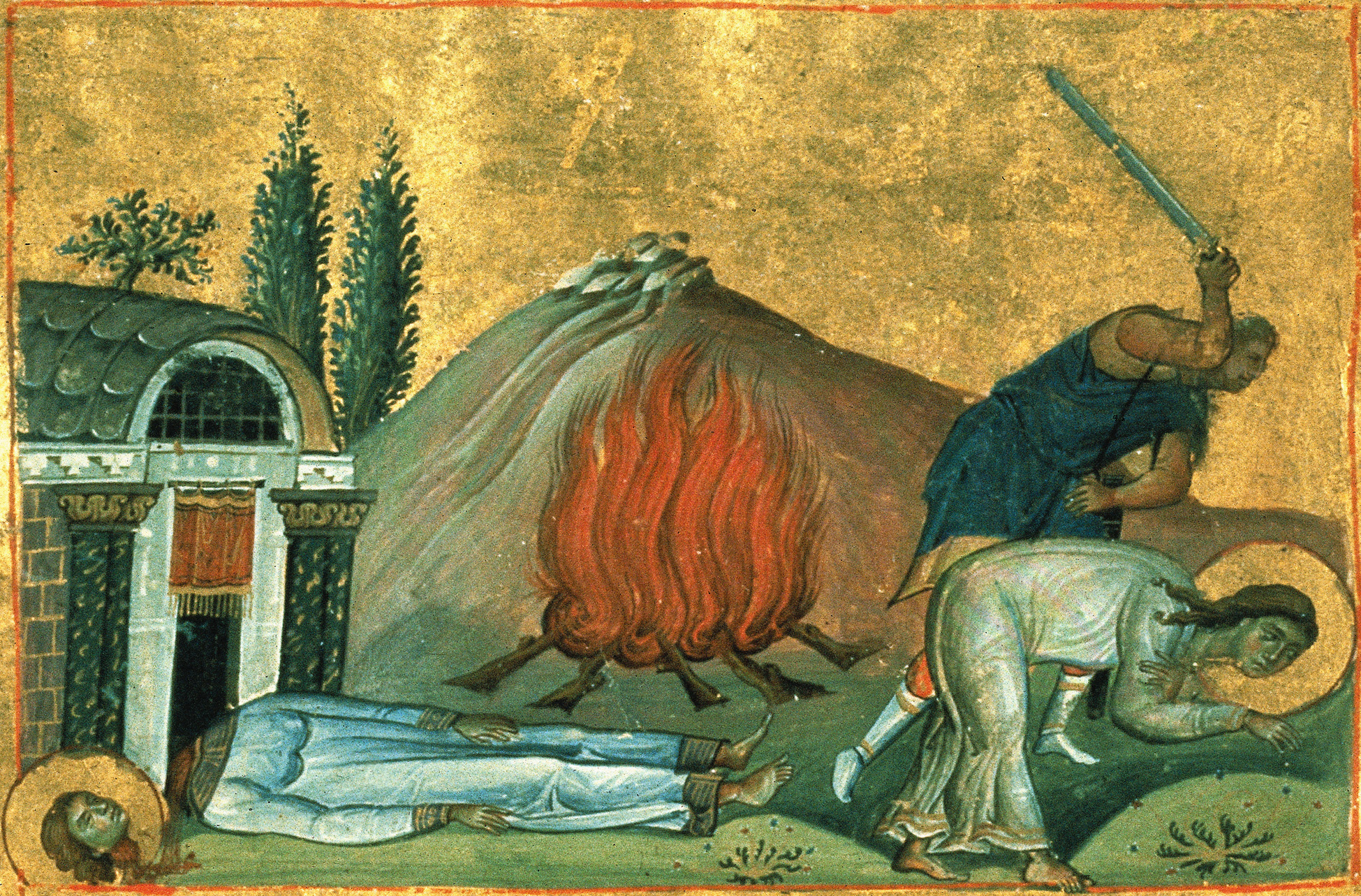
Martyrs Capitolina and Eroteis, of Cappadocia.
(Menologion of Basil II, 10th century).

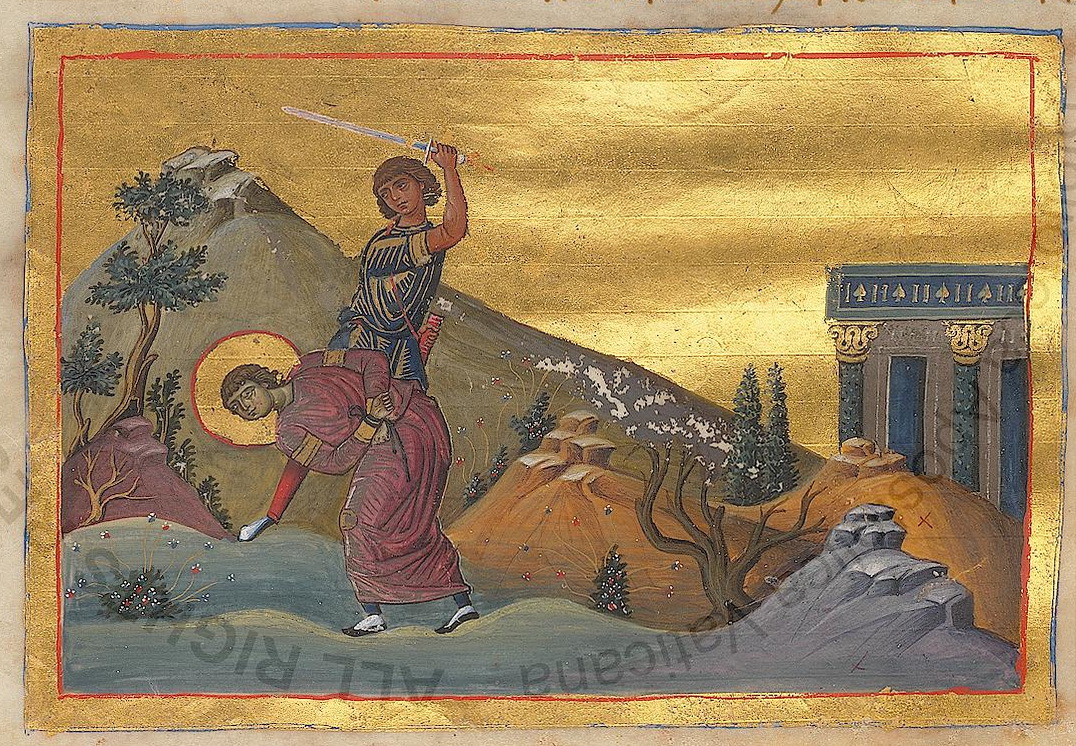
Martyr Nestor of Thessaloniki.
(Menologion of Basil II, 10th century).

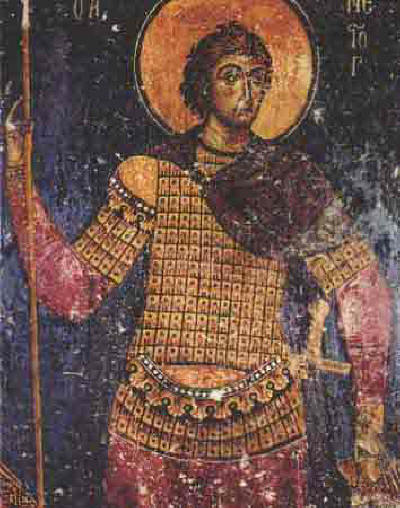
Martyr Nestor of Thessaloniki.

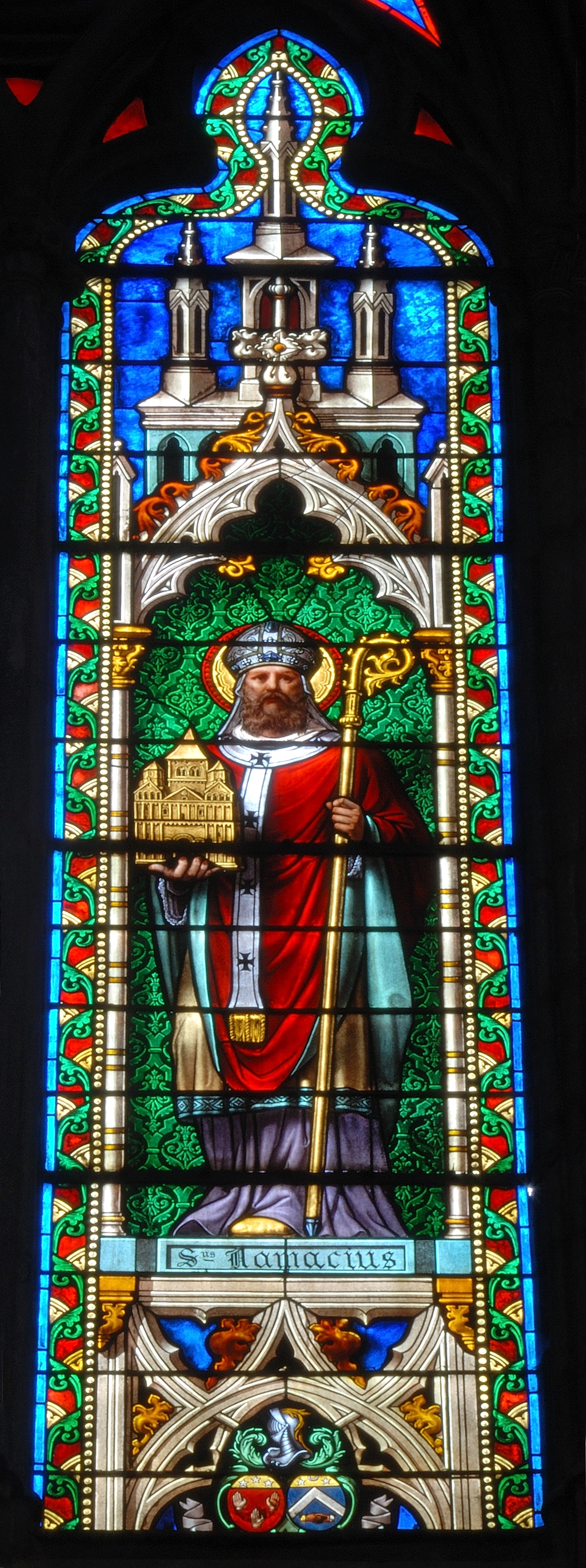
St. Namatius, Bishop of Clermont.

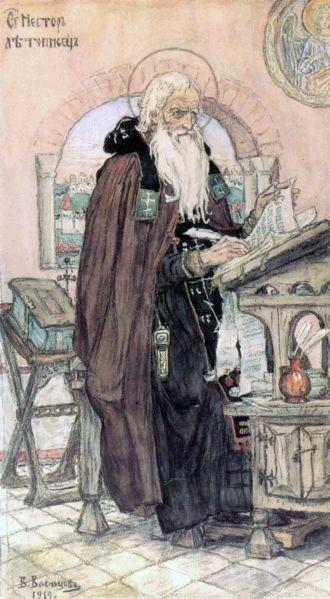
Venerable Nestor the Chronicler, of the Kiev Caves.

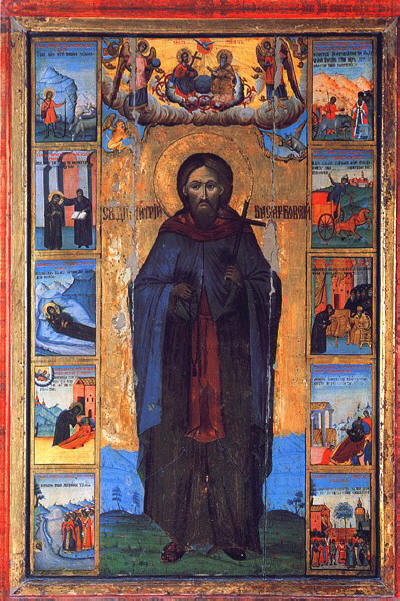
Saint Demetrius of Basarabov, Bulgaria.

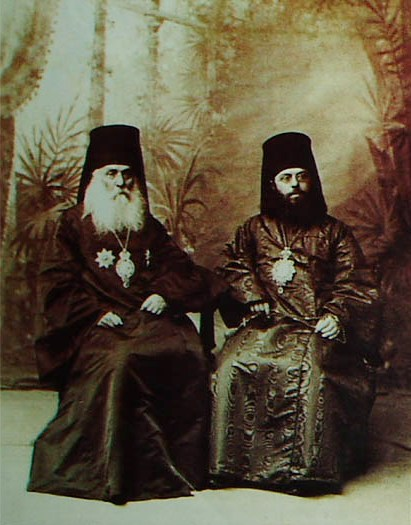
St. Alexandre Oqropiridze
and his nephew Leonide Oqropiridze.

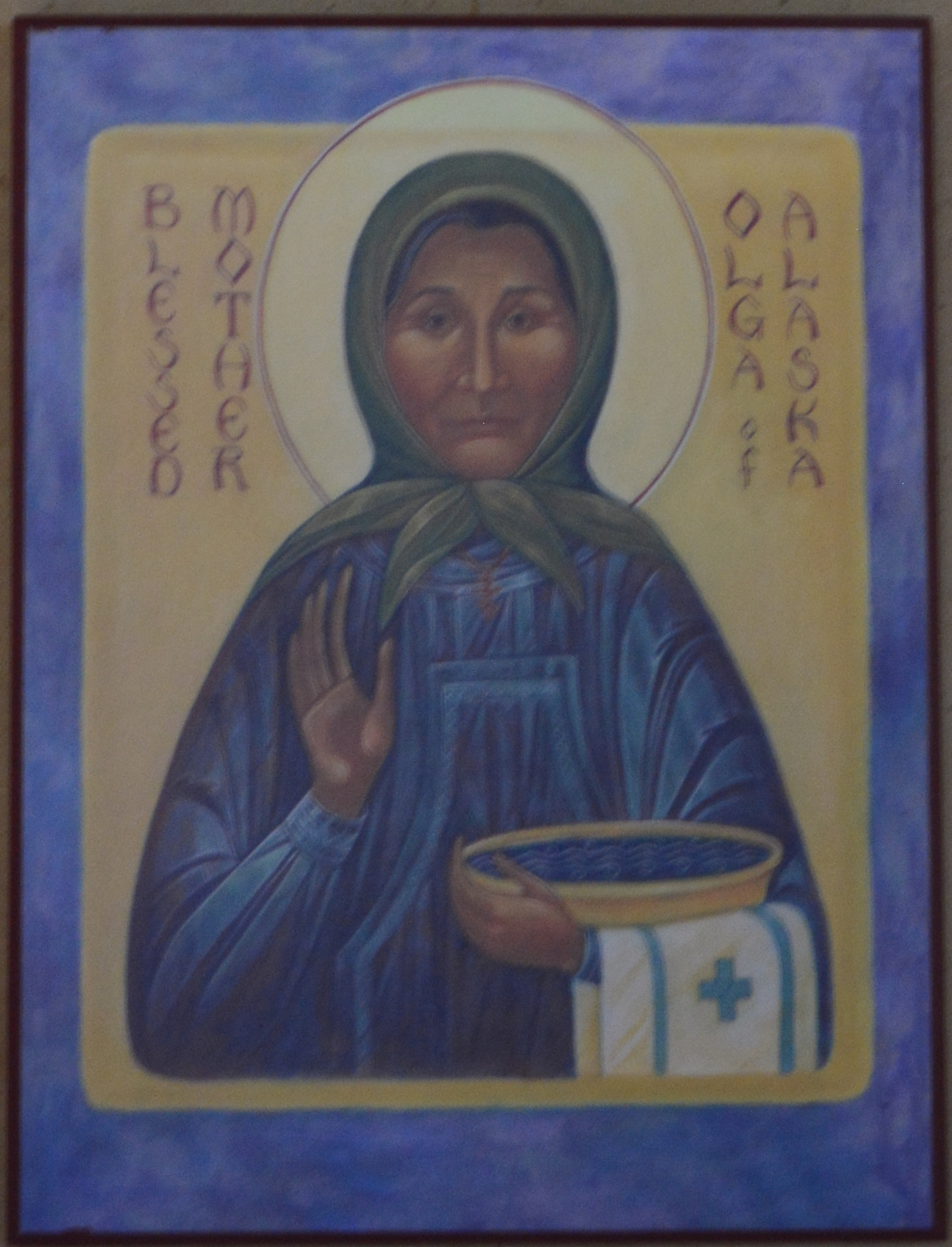
Righteous Mother Olga Arrsamquq Michael of Kwethluk, Alaska.

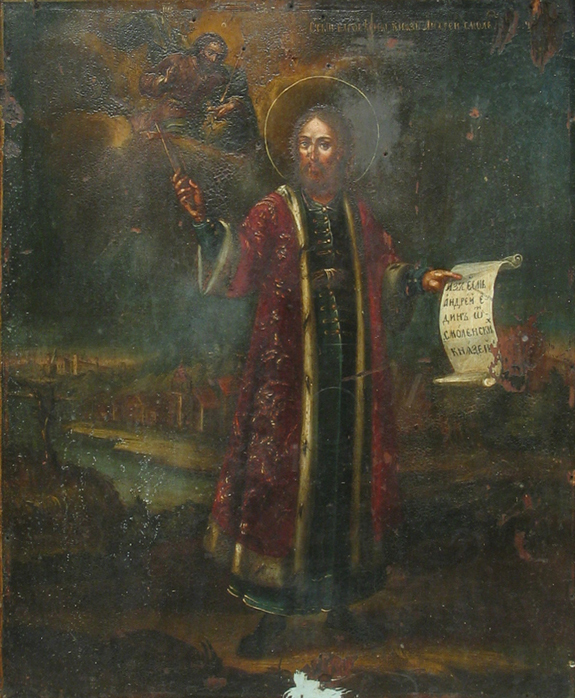
St. Andrew, Prince of Smolensk.

== Sources ==
- October 27 / November 9. Orthodox Calendar (PRAVOSLAVIE.RU).
- November 9 / October 27. HOLY TRINITY RUSSIAN ORTHODOX CHURCH (A parish of the Patriarchate of Moscow).
- October 27. OCA - The Lives of the Saints.
- The Autonomous Orthodox Metropolia of Western Europe and the Americas (ROCOR). St. Hilarion Calendar of Saints for the year of our Lord 2004. St. Hilarion Press (Austin, TX). p. 80.
- The Twenty-Seventh Day of the Month of October. Orthodoxy in China.
- October 27. Latin Saints of the Orthodox Patriarchate of Rome.
- The Roman Martyrology. Transl. by the Archbishop of Baltimore. Last Edition, According to the Copy Printed at Rome in 1914. Revised Edition, with the Imprimatur of His Eminence Cardinal Gibbons. Baltimore: John Murphy Company, 1916. p. 331.
- Rev. Richard Stanton. A Menology of England and Wales, or, Brief Memorials of the Ancient British and English Saints Arranged According to the Calendar, Together with the Martyrs of the 16th and 17th Centuries. London: Burns & Oates, 1892. p. 516.

Greek Sources

- Great Synaxaristes: (in Greek) 27 ΟΚΤΩΒΡΙΟΥ. ΜΕΓΑΣ ΣΥΝΑΞΑΡΙΣΤΗΣ.
- (in Greek) Συναξαριστής. 27 Οκτωβρίου. ECCLESIA.GR. (H ΕΚΚΛΗΣΙΑ ΤΗΣ ΕΛΛΑΔΟΣ).
- (in Greek) 27/10/2017. Ορθόδοξος Συναξαριστής.

Russian Sources

- (in Russian) 9 ноября (27 октября). Православная Энциклопедия под редакцией Патриарха Московского и всея Руси Кирилла (электронная версия). (Orthodox Encyclopedia - Pravenc.ru).
- (in Russian) 27 октября по старому стилю / 9 ноября по новому стилю. Русская Православная Церковь - Православный церковный календарь на 2016 год.
