= Ignace Lepp =

French writer

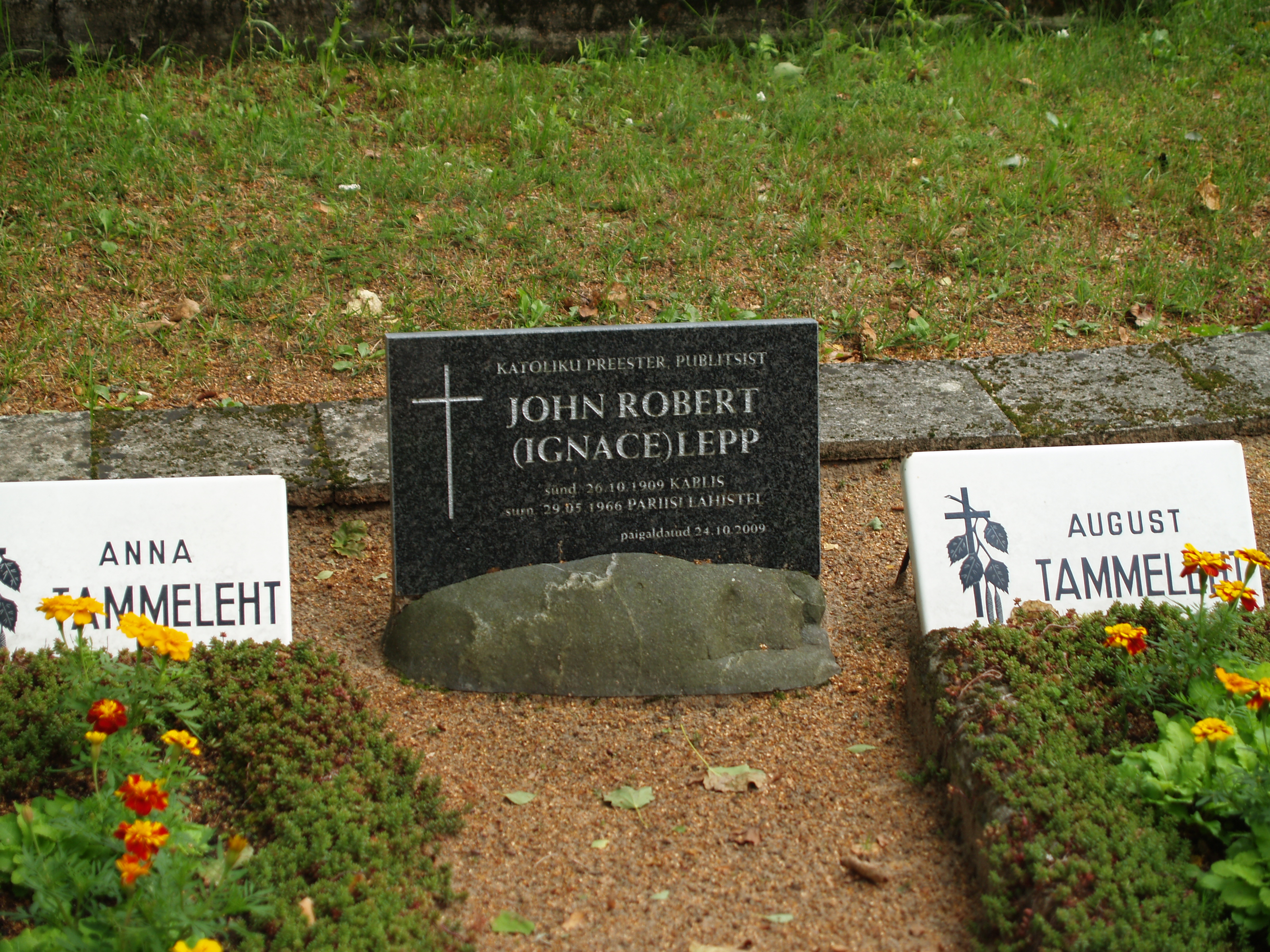
Memorial stone of Ignace Lepp at Treimani cemetery, Estonia.

Ignace Lepp (born John Robert Lepp; 26 October 1909 in Orajõe, Pärnu County, Livonia, Russian Empire – 29 May 1966 near Paris, France), was a French writer of Estonian origin.

Despite his claim to have been the son of a naval captain, born aboard a ship in the Baltic Sea where he was brought up by his mother together with his brother until he was five years old, this is not true. He was in fact the son of Tõnis Lepp and Anna Jürgenson, born in Orajõe village, in Häädemeeste Parish. He was given the names John Robert which were the first names of his godfather John Robert Birk. His godfather's father was indeed a ship's captain, and John Robert Lepp simply claimed his godfather's occupation as that of his father. His parents were farmers, not seagoing people. He gave an incorrect date of birth. He was born on 11 October 1909 and not 26 October that year.The difference in dates was probably due to the fact that many countries didn't adopt the Gregorian calendar until early 20th century, e.g., Russia after the October Revolution, Bulgaria in 1916, Greece in 1922. At the age of 15, he joined the French Communist Party after reading Maxim Gorki's The Mother, a novel which made a lasting impression on him and led him to abandon individualism as he himself recalls in the nearest we have to an autobiography From Karl Marx to Jesus Christ.

According to his book Atheism in Our Time, Lepp was an atheist and Marxist for many years and claimed to have occupied important positions in the communist party with whom he later became very disillusioned. He then converted to Roman Catholicism and was ordained a priest in 1941. He wrote many non-fiction books including some about atheism, religion. He was a psychologist and psychoanalyst.

He wrote among other books: The Ways of Friendship, The Psychology of Loving, The Authentic Existence, The Communication of Existences. He also wrote The faith of men; meditations inspired by Teilhard de Chardin (Teilhard et la foi des homme), about the French thinker Pierre Teilhard de Chardin.

== Bibliography ==
- The Challenges of Life: Viewing Ourselves In Our Existential Totality, 1969
- The Art of Being an Intellectual, 1968
- The Depths of the Soul: a Christian Approach to Psychoanalysis, Staten Island, N.Y.: Alba House, 1966 (orig. Clarté et ténèbres de l’âme: Essai de psychosynthèse, Paris: Aubier, 1956)
- The Ways of Friendship, New York: Macmillan Co., 1966
- The Authentic Morality, 1965
- A Christian Philosophy of Existence, 1965
- Atheism In Our Time, New York: Macmillan Co., 1963
- The Psychology of Loving, 1963
- The Christian Failure, 1962
- Health of Mind and Soul, New York: Alba, 1966 (orig. Hygiène De L'Âme, Paris: Aubier, 1958)
- Death & Its Mysteries, 1968
