= Nestor of Thessaloniki =

Greek saint and martyr (died 306)

Saint Nestor
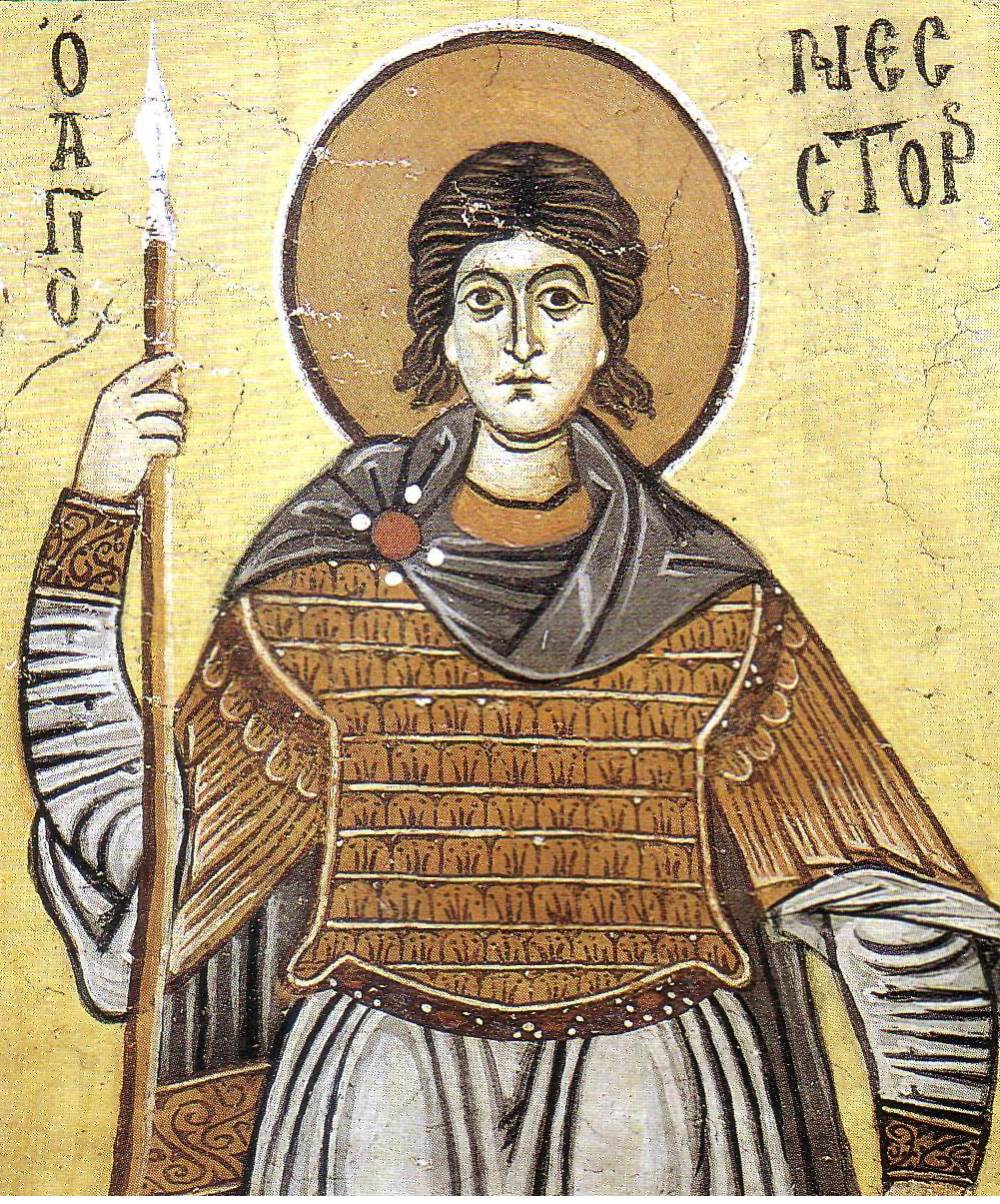
- Fresco from Hosios Loukas
- Born: Thessaloniki, Roman Empire
- Died: October 27
- Cause of death: beheading
- Canonized: Pre-congregation
- Patronage: wrestlers, athletes

Nestor of Thessalonica (Greek: Νέστωρ της Θεσσαλονίκης) is a saint and wrestler known for having been the companion of St. Demetrius of Thessalonica (October 26). St. Nestor's feast day is celebrated on October 27. Nestor is usually seen in warriors atire and wearing warrior clothing.

== Biography ==
Having been moved to act against the mighty Lyaeus, the most feared gladiator in Rome, who mocked and tormented the Christians in the arena, Nestor went to see the imprisoned St. Demetrius and asked for his blessing to fight and defeat Lyeios. With the blessing of the saint and faith in God, he entered the arena and mortally struck Lyeios.

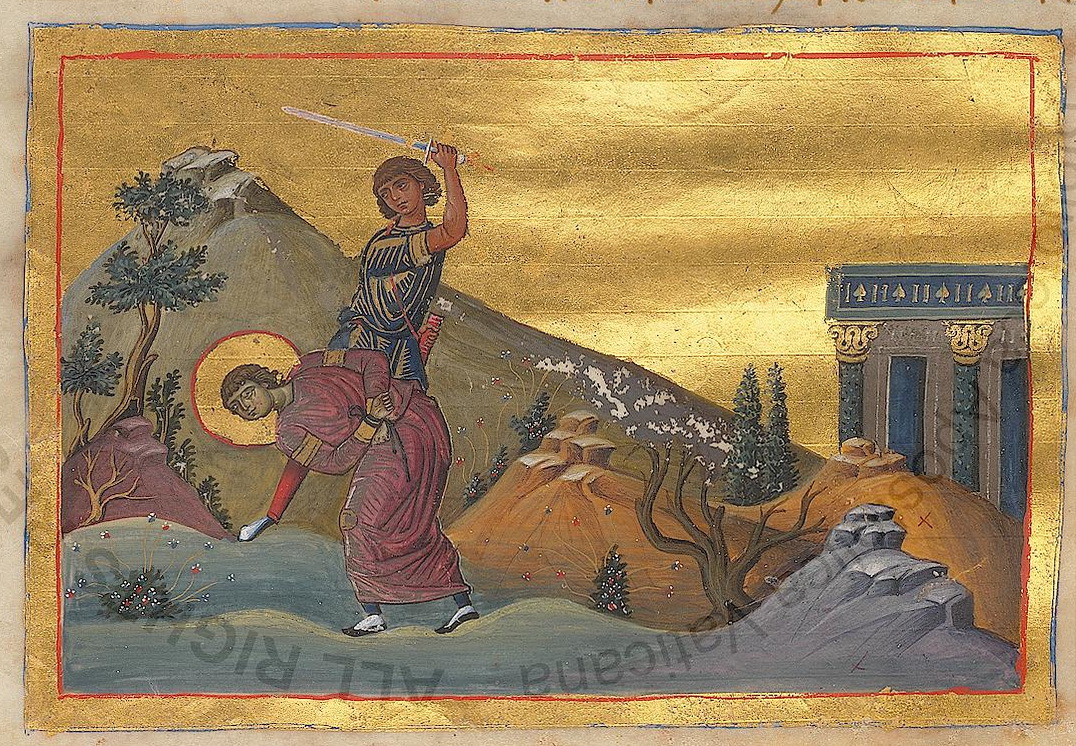
Martyrdom of Nestor, depicted in the 11th century Menologion of Basil II.

Maximian, the emperor, was angered by this and ordered that Nestor be slain with his own sword.

== Feast day ==
The year of his death is reported variously as 290, 296, or 306 AD, each on October 27 around the age of 20.
