= Orajõe, Pärnu County =

Village in Estonia

Coordinates: 57°57′09″N 24°23′44″E

- Village
- Interactive map of Orajõe, Pärnu County
- Country: Estonia
- County: Pärnu County
- Parish: Häädemeeste Parish
- Time zone: UTC+2 (EET)
  - Summer (DST): UTC+3 (EEST)

Orajõe (German: Orrenhof) is a village in Häädemeeste Parish, Pärnu County in southwestern Estonia.
