= Saint Quadragesimus =

Christian saint

Saint Quadragesimus (d. 590AD) was, according to tradition, a shepherd who lived at Policastro, Italy, and served as a subdeacon. Not much else is known of him, and he is remembered solely for the miracle of raising a dead man to life. He was mentioned under 26 October in earlier editions of the Roman Martyrology, but is not listed in the latest editions.

Surio, in his Historiae seu vitae sanctorum (vol XI (November), pp. 956–957, Marietti, 1879), writes: "The first person to refer to this saint by name was Saint Gregory the Great, in Book Three of his Dialogues, chapter 17. From this source...Baronio got the name of Quadragesimus, as he affirms himself..."

Of Quadragesimus, Gregory the Great writes:

Not long since in our time, a certain man called Quadragesimus was subdeacon in the church of Buxentin, who in times past kept a flock of sheep in the same country of Aurelia: by whose faithful report I understood a marvellous strange thing, which is this. At such time as he led a shepherd's life, there was an holy man that dwelt in the mountain of Argentario: whose religious conversation and inward virtue was answerable to the habit of a monk, which outwardly he did wear. Every year he travelled from his mountain to the church of St. Peter, Prince of the Apostles: and in the way took this Quadragesimus' house for his lodging, as himself did tell me. Coming upon a day to his house, which was hard by the church, a poor woman's husband died not far off, whom when they had, as the manner is, washed, put on his garments, and made him ready to be buried, yet it was so late, that it could not be done that day: wherefore the desolate widow sat by the dead corpse, weeping all night long, and to satisfy her grief she did continually lament and cry out. The man of God, seeing her so pitifully to weep and never to give over, was much grieved, and said to Quadragesimus the subdeacon: "My soul taketh compassion of this woman's sorrow, arise, I beseech you, and let us pray": and thereupon they went to the church, which, as I said, was hard by, and fell to their devotions. And when they had prayed a good while, the servant of God desired Quadragesimus to conclude their prayer; which being done, he took a little dust from the side of the altar: and so came with Quadragesimus to the dead body; and there he began again to pray, and when he continued so a long time, he desired him not, as he did before, to conclude their prayers, but himself gave the blessing, and so rose up: and because he had the dust in his right hand, with his left he took away the cloth that covered the dead man's face; which the woman seeing, earnestly withstood him, and marvelled much what he meant to do: when the cloth was gone, he rubbed the dead man's face a good while with the dust, which he had taken up; and at length, he that was dead received his soul again, began to open his mouth and his eyes, and to sit up, and as though he had awakened from a deep sleep, marvelled what they did about him; which when the woman, that had wearied herself with crying, beheld, she began then afresh to weep for joy, and cry out far louder than she did before: but the man of God modestly forbad her, saying: "Peace, good woman, and say nothing, and if any demand how this happened, say only, that our Lord Jesus Christ hath vouchsafed to work his pleasure." Thus he spake, and forthwith he departed from Quadragesimus, and never came to his house again. For, desirous to avoid all temporal honour, he so handled the matter, that they which saw him work that miracle, did never see him more so long as he lived.
