= Lupus of Novae =

Saint Lupus of Novae
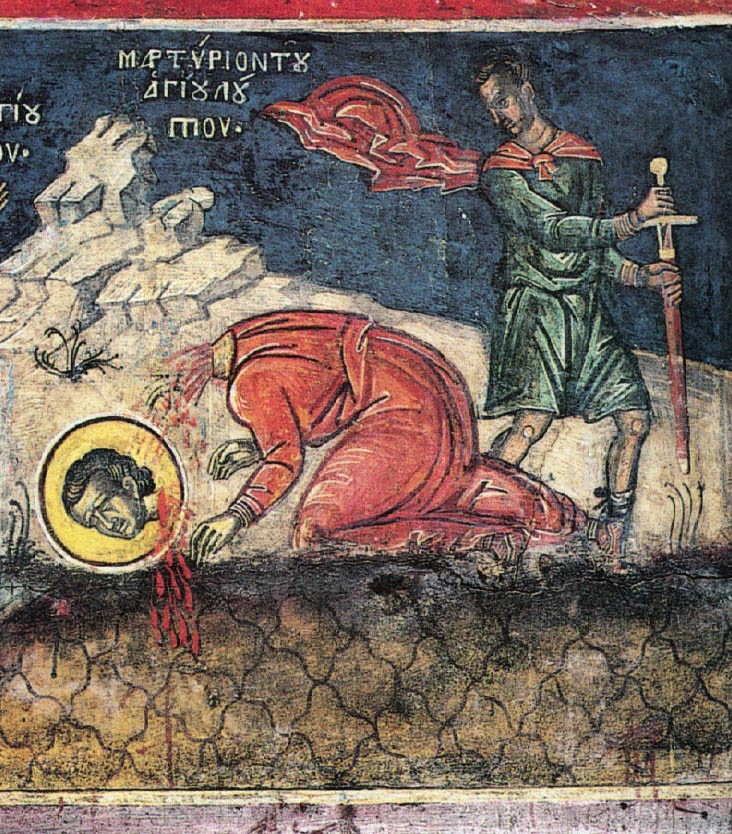
- Fresco of the Martyrdom of Saint Lupus at Dionysiou Monastery, 1547
- Born: c. 3rd Century AD; Novae
- Died: c. 4th Century AD; Thessaloniki
- Venerated in: Eastern Orthodox Church; Catholic Church
- Feast: 23 August

Saint Lupus of Novae (Romanian: Sfântul Lup) is a Dacian or Roman saint who was for a while the servant of Saint Demetrius of Thessaloniki. He is celebrated on August 23.

== Life ==
Lupus lived in Novae, a Roman fortress in the Danube valley, today the Bulgarian town Svishtov. Lupus lived at the end of the 3rd century and beginning of the 4th century. He was contemporary with Roman Christian martyrs Montanus and Anastasia from Sirmium.

Lupus was a faithful servant of the martyr Demetrius of Thessaloniki (October 26). He was present at the death of his master, and he soaked his own clothing with his blood and took a ring from his hand. With these objects St Lupus worked many miracles at Thessaloniki. He attacked pagan idols, for which he was subjected to persecution by the pagans, but he was preserved unharmed. St Lupus voluntarily delivered himself into the hands of the torturers, and by order of the Emperor Galerius, he was beheaded by the sword on August 23, shortly after St. Demetrius death (probably in 307).

Frederick George Holweck says "his story is apocryphal". Lupus is connected to Novae, but not to Demetrius, nor to Thessaloniki.

== Novae ==
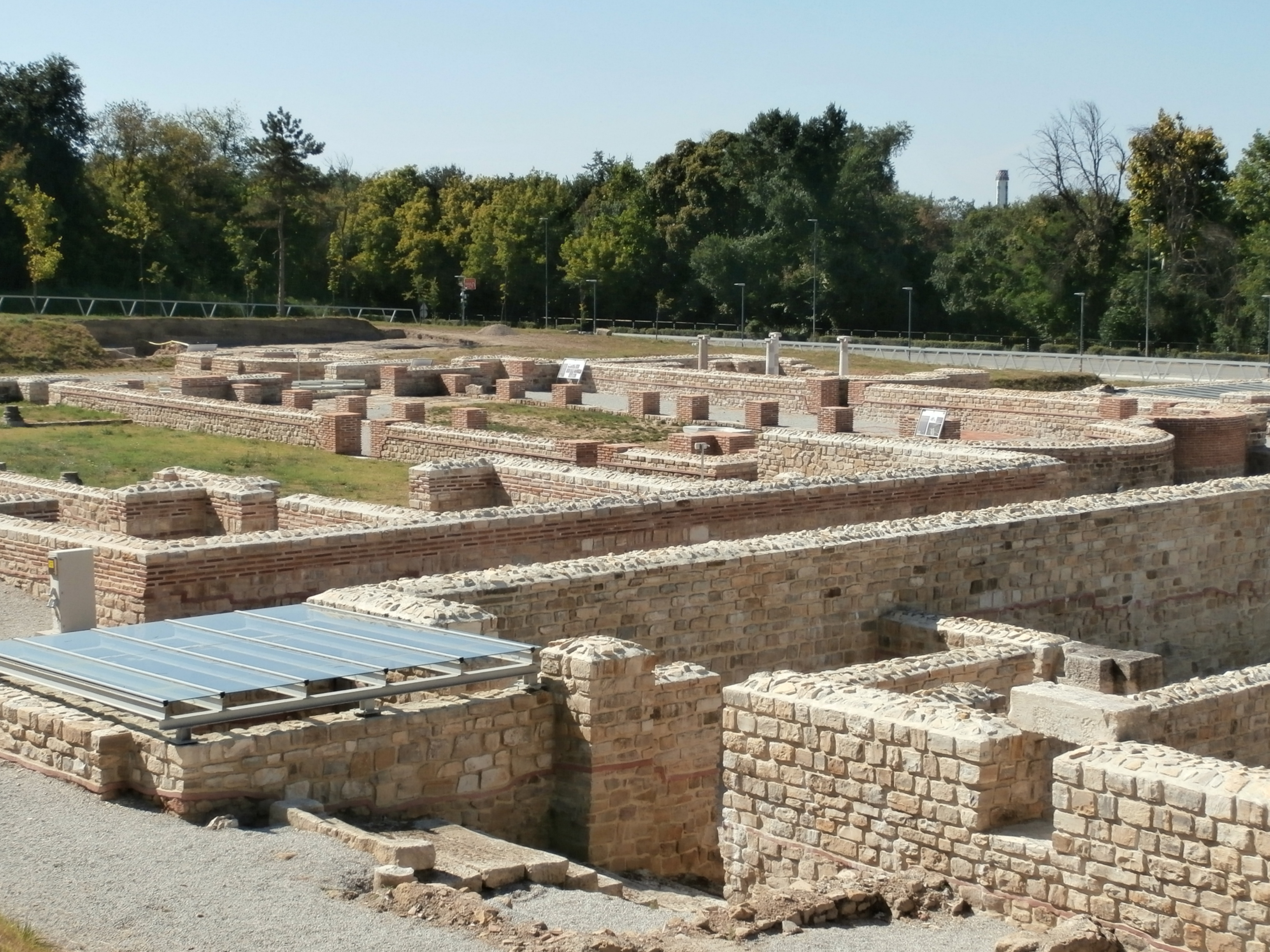
Novae - Bishop complex with main basilica

The old legion fortress of Novae turned into a Roman-Byzantine town in the 5th – 6th century . The ruins of the Bishop's complex date back to those times. The ruins consist of a large basilica, residential houses with impressive baths, and a large building, which was designated for receiving the pilgrims to the local martyr St. Lupus. A baptistery impressive with its architecture was found west from the basilica entrance.

Peter, the brother of the Emperor Mauricius (582-602) passed with his army through Novae at the end of the 6th century during his campaign in Dacian territories. A chronicle described the visit of Peter and the celebrations of St. Lupus day in Novae.
