= Rusticus of Narbonne =

Rusticus of Narbonne (in French Rustique; died 26 October perhaps 461 AD,) was a monk of the Lérins Abbey and bishop of Narbonne; he was considered a Catholic saint of Gaul.

Rusticus was born either at Marseille or at Narbonne. According to the Roman Martyrology, when he had completed his education in Gaul, Rusticus went to Rome, where he soon gained a reputation as a public speaker, but he wished to embrace the contemplative life. He wrote to Jerome, who advised him to continue his studies, commending him to imitate the virtues of Exuperius of Toulouse and to follow the advice of Proculus, then Bishop of Marseille. Thus Rusticus entered the Lérins Abbey.

He was ordained at Marseille, and on 3 October 430 (or 427) was consecrated Bishop of Narbonne. He was present at the First Council of Ephesus in 431 With all his zeal, he could not prevent the progress of the Arian heresy which the Goths were spreading abroad; there is evidence that an Arian rival bishop was established in Narbonne.

The siege of Narbonne by the Goths in 436 and dissensions among the Catholics so disheartened him that he wrote to Pope Leo I, renouncing the bishopric, but Leo dissuaded him (Epistle CLXVII).

Rusticus then endeavored to consolidate the Catholics. In 444–448, he rebuilt the church in Narbonne dedicated to Saint Genès of Arles, which had burned in 441; the lower part of the cathedral tower, however, which was once attributed to Rusticus, is now seen to be work of the 14th century.

He was one of the twelve bishops who assembled in 449, to elect Ravennius bishop of Arles.

In 451, he assisted at the convocation of forty-four bishops of Gaul and approved Leo's letter to Flavian, concerning Nestorianism. He was present also at a Council of Arles, held at some point between 449 and 461, with thirteen bishops, to decide the dispute between Theodore, Bishop of Fréjus, and the Abbey of Lérins. a letter from Ravennius to Rusticus, proves the high esteem in which he was held. Rusticus' own letters are lost, with the exception of the one to Jerome and two others to Leo, written either in 452 or 458.

== Bibliography ==
- Ekkart Sauser (2004). "Rusticus: hl. Bischof von Narbonne". In Bautz, Traugott (ed.). Biographisch-Bibliographisches Kirchenlexikon (BBKL) (in German). Vol. 23. Nordhausen: Bautz. col. 1262. ISBN 3-88309-155-3.
- Letter of Leo the Great (CLXVII) to Rusticus
- Marrou, Henri-Irenee, "Le dossier epigraphique de l'eveque Rusticus de Narbonne," Rivista di archeologia cristiana 3-4 (1970) pp 331– 349.
