= Asa Ames =

American sculptor (1823-1851)

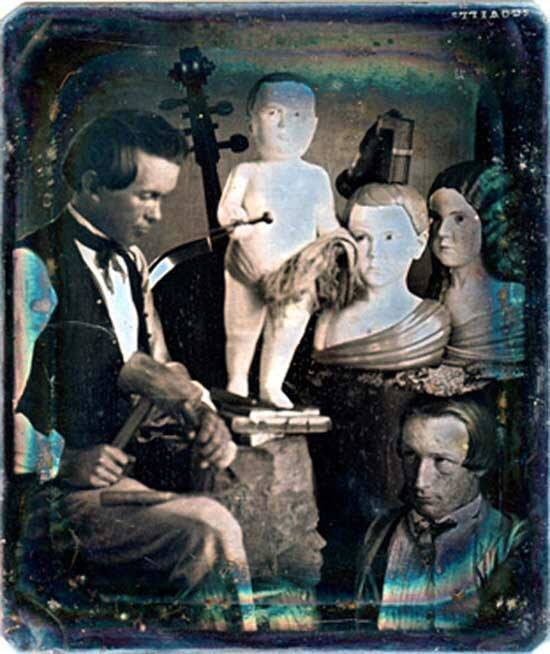
- Sculptor Asa Ames working, 1849-1851
- Born: December 28, 1823; Evans, New York
- Died: August 4, 1851 (aged 27); Erie County, New York
- Known for: Sculpture

Asa Ames (1823–1851) was an American artist who is today considered one of the most significant American folk art sculptors of the 19th century. Within his brief career, which spanned from 1847 to his death in 1851, Ames created a series of at least nineteen unique, three-dimensional portraits of family members, neighbors, friends and on at least one occasion, national political figures. Ames's work received acclaim during his own lifetime, culminating in the presentation of a silver medal for his work at the New York State Fair in 1848. His carvings — which primarily depict children and young adults — are held in the collections of a number of prominent American art institutions, including the Abby Aldrich Rockefeller Folk Art Museum, American Folk Art Museum, Boulder History Museum, Huntington Museum of Art, New York State Historical Association and Wadsworth Atheneum.

== Life ==
Asa Ames was born on December 28, 1823, in Evans, New York, some twenty miles south of Buffalo, New York. His parents, John Ames (1791 – 1830) and Susan Gates Ames (1790 — 1865), had recently moved there from Worcester County, Massachusetts, probably in anticipation of the greater economic opportunity to come with the opening of the Erie Canal, which followed in 1825. After the death of John Ames in 1830, when Asa was seven, his mother remarried in 1842, to Elias Babcock, but was to be widowed a second time two years later. Asa was the fourth of five children, with his siblings and their families playing an important part in his career; at least four of Ames's known oeuvre of nineteen (previously fourteen, see the new additions below under list of known works) works portray family members. Others portray neighbors in Evans, some of whom Ames lived with for a time. His work as a sculptor is therefore deeply rooted in his kinship network and local community, which was in tension with other aspects of his career which point to the rising tide of modernity, notably his interest in phrenology.

Ames died on August 4, 1851, possibly of tuberculosis, with his tombstone giving his final age as "27 years, 7 months, and 7 days." His name would not be recovered by art historians until 1977, when Jack T. Ericson discovered it in the 1850 federal census for Evans, New York; publication followed five years later in 1982, establishing the basis for subsequent scholarship. Since then Asa Ames has assumed an eminent place in the history of American art as a leading folk sculptor of the 19th century.

Ames's short life is sparely documented. The dates of his birth and death are known by his tombstone, other details (including his occupation, described as "sculpturing") in the federal census of 1850, with the gaps in the record skillfully reconstructed by art historians on the basis of nineteen works (signed and unsigned, the latter attributions grounded on style and provenance) and the web of connections they have revealed. Additionally, descendants of Asa Ames have proved helpful to historians by making accessible family records, which show that Ames was married to a woman named Emma Hurd (1830 – 1893) of the Marvin household, where Ames was a resident at the time of the 1850 census shortly before his death. Even more significantly, the Ames family has helped identify subjects of the sculptors' portraits.

== "Sculpturing" ==
Despite the fact that little is known about the Ames's artistic formation, his skill "suggests that he served an apprenticeship" during his youth, "although it is not clear in what profession." Ames's medium of wood distinguished him from his contemporaries. In the nineteenth century, painting was understood as the common medium for portraiture. In contrast, woodcarving was employed in the more humble production of advertising figures and ship carving. Ames's distinctiveness lies in his ability to construct such emotionally commanding portraiture out of this vernacular medium.

Scholars have debated whether Ames’ work should be understood as a direct descendant of the ship carving genre, or rather, as part of the classical tradition of sculpture. Typical ship carving of figureheads have a forward thrust, which is absent from Ames’ work. Additionally, with the exception of one piece, Ames's works have “no flowing neoclassical draperies” – another characteristic of the ship carving tradition. To some extent, Ames's self-described occupation of “sculpturing” in the United States census of 1850 offers a glimpse into the artist's self-perception. Despite the fact that “sculpturing” was usually reserved to describe works of stone or metal, Ames employed it freely in the census. He professed his work to be one of artistic merit.

== Portraits ==
Ames dedicated most of his career to carving likenesses of his relatives and friends. His portraits reveal an attentive eye to the particular – to the individual characteristics of each of his subjects, which he portrayed in a straightforward fashion. Characteristic of Ames’ portraits are “broad foreheads and uncompromising eyes,” which Ames “carved deeply under heavy brows, the eyelashes painted as a series of dots.” In 1847 Ames carved frontal busts of his sister's three children: Millard F., Maria, and Adelaide. Afterwards, while living with Dr. Thomas Armstrong later that year, he set out to carve a likeness of Dr. Thomas Armstrong’ daughter – Amanda Clayanna. What resulted is a standing figure of the young girl, “leaning against a draped tablet in slight contrapposto.”

From 1847 to 1851, Ames carved three portraits of adults – two men and one woman. Scholars have recently suggested that this series of portraits may represent portraits of Ames’ two brothers and sister.

In 1849 Ames crafted two carvings of children – a full-figured statue of a young girl and a Naked Child. The young girl has been identified as Susan Ames, the daughter of Ames's brother, Henry. Naked Child probably represents a likeness of the son of Dr. Harvey B. Marvin – LaRay Marvin. At the time this sculpture was carved, Ames was living with the family; young LaRay was seven months old. The work Seated Female Figure with Lamb and Cup was the last carving to be dated by Ames in April 1850 — a little more than a year before his death. Widely understood as a memorial to two young sisters, Sarah Reliance and Ann Augusta Ayer, Ames inscribed in wood their death from cholera in 1849, at the ages of three and one, respectively.

== Phrenological head ==
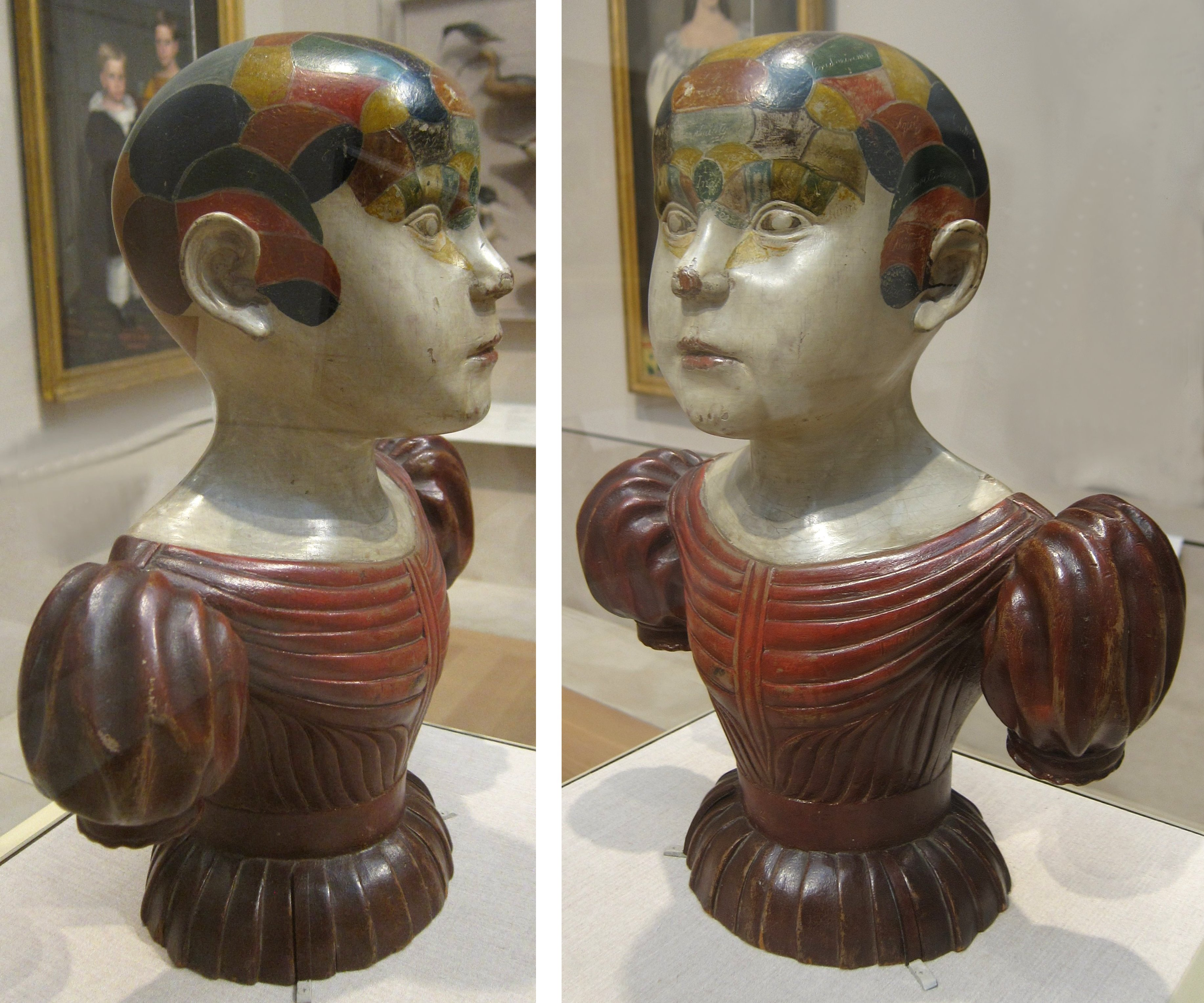
Wooden phrenological head attributed to Asa Ames

Ames's 1850 phreonological bust, currently in the American Folk Art Museum's collection, is perhaps the artist's most unusual work. Since its introduction at the Brooklyn Museum's 1948 exhibition “Popular Art in America,” the bust has testified both to the profound impact of phrenology on the 19th-century American psyche and to Ames's increasingly sophisticated craft.

At the height of its influence, phrenology had become a visible practice of both urban and rural landscapes. Individual operators, inspired by the commercial success of the Fowler brothers, offered "phrenological observations" to the public. This increase in interest brought about the distribution of phrenological tools; plaster casts, measuring devices, charts, and to some extent, modeled phrenological heads, became increasingly common.

While it is not known why exactly Ames's carved this phrenological study, some have suggested that Dr. Marvin, the physician that Ames was living with at the time, fostered his interest in "alternative" medicine. Marvin, who explored remedies such as hydrotherapy and magnet therapy, perhaps inspired Ames's study of phrenology. Additionally, given the fact that Ames soon fell ill to tuberculosis, he might have been seeking treatment from Dr. Marvin.

== Modern exhibitions ==
Ames's sculptures made their debut at the Newark Museum's 1931 exhibition "American Folk Sculptures: The Work of Eighteenth and Nineteenth Century Craftsmen." However, the exhibit incorrectly identified their creator to be Alexander Ames, not Asa Ames. Asa Ames finally earned his own solo exhibition in 2008. From April to September, The American Folk Art Museum launched the show "Asa Ames: Occupational Sculpturing." The exhibition featured eight of his works, as well as a newly discovered daguerreotype of the artist.

== Daguerreotype ==
The daguerreotype found in the collection of the Ames family is singularly exceptional in that it shows the sculptor surrounded by several of his creations while working on another. Asa Ames is seated at the left, working on a new bust located between his legs (now believed, based on studies of its profile and of Ames's own image, to be his self portrait held in the collection of the Huntington Museum of Art) while behind him at center is the top of a viola and four additional sculptural works on display. They include his sculpture of a naked child (here draped and holding an object in its right hand), his study of a hand holding a book and two portrait busts, one depicting a young boy and the other a young girl. In the lower right foreground is the mysterious image of another young man, perhaps a member of the Ames family.

The purpose of staging such an elaborate image is open to interpretation. However, it seems likely that it was created at some point not long after Ames received his silver medal in 1848 as a promotional image or device. Due to its small size, Fleming believes it may have been prominently displayed to potential clients when Ames traveled to their homes to propose creating a sculpture for them as a way to show the quality and types of work he was capable of creating. This may be especially true as unlike many of his contemporaries, Ames was not known to have maintained a fixed studio space and is often reported as residing with his clients during the creation of their commissions.

== List of known works ==
Currently, there are nineteen works (eighteen portrait figures, one doll) known to have been made by Asa Ames during his very short career. While most examples are held in public and private collections, the location of several works remain unknown at present. Of these, nearly all were exhibited at some point either during the artist's lifetime or during the early part of the 20th century. Only one work is known to have been destroyed since its creation.

- Bust Portrait of Millard F. Dewey - January 1847 - currently held in a private collection, 2008. Millard F. Dewey (b. 1845) was the artist's nephew. Inscription: "Jan. 1847/ A. Ames." Discovered in 1978 in the garage attic of a descendant of Millard Dewey. Illustrated in Jack T. Ericson's "Asa Ames: Sculptor" in the magazine Antiques (September 1982).
- Full-Length Portrait of General Zachary Taylor - spring/summer 1847–present location unknown. Geoffrey K. Fleming, executive director of the Huntington Museum of Art, where Ames's probable self portrait is held, recently (2020) discovered a nineteenth work documented in an article in the Buffalo Commercial Advertiser (Sept 1, 1847) which announced the exhibition of a full-length carved figure of General Taylor (1784 - 1850) which was placed on display in the autumn of 1847 at the Buffalo, New York Merchant's Exchange. The Exchange was completed in 1844 by Russell H. Heywood and was located near the docks at the Buffalo waterfront. The paper noted that it was by Asa Ames of "Evans, in this county" and further noted Ames had only been carving for six months (slightly off based on the month and date of the Millard Dewey bust). The paper further remarked that "Under such circumstances this is a very creditable specimen.” The display of the bust in that location, in such proximity to the docks, lends credence to the idea that Ames may have initially studied with a ship or figurehead carver. It was for the creation of the sculpture of Taylor, and one of a little girl (possibly for one of his figures depicting Maria or Adelaide Dewey or Amanda Armstrong), that Ames was awarded a silver medal at the New York State Fair in September 1848, as reported again in the Buffalo Commercial Advertiser (Sept 11, 1848): To “A. Ames, Evans, Erie co., for a full length likeness of Gen. Taylor, and the figure of a little girl, as specimens of wood carving executed by a lad with a knife, that showed extraordinary and early talent and perseverance. sil. med."
- Bust Portrait of a Young Man in A Buttoned Jacket - March 1847 - currently held in the collection of the New York State Historical Association, Cooperstown, New York, gift of Stephan Clark. Inscription: "A. Ames March 1847." Thought to depict the artist's brother, Henry G. Ames (b. 1822). Illustrated in Jack T. Ericson's "Asa Ames: Sculptor" in the magazine Antiques (September 1982); Stacy C. Hollander's Asa Ames: Occupation Sculpturing (New York: American Folk Art Museum, 2008).
- Bust Portrait of Maria Dewey - 1847–present location unknown. Maria Dewey (b. 1843) was the artist's niece. This carving was exhibited in “American Folk Sculpture: the Work of Eighteenth- and Nineteenth-Century Craftsmen,” at the Newark Museum in 1931. Inscription said to be signed by Ames and dated 1847. Illustrated in Jean Lipman's American Folk Art in Wood, Metal and Stone (New York: Dover Publications, 1948); Jack T. Ericson's "Asa Ames: Sculptor" in the magazine Antiques (September 1982); Stacy C. Hollander's "Asa Ames and the Art of Phrenology" in The Clarion (Summer 1989).
- Bust Portrait of Adelaide Dewey - 1847 - destroyed. Formerly in the collection of the Fitchburg Art Museum, Fitchburg, Massachusetts, gift of Milton Cushing, 1930. This sculpture of Adelaide Dewey (b. 1835), the artist's niece, was destroyed in a fire in 1933. Inscription said to be inscribed by Ames with a location of Albany and dated 1847.
- Full-Length Portrait of Amanda Clayanna Armstrong - November 1847 - currently held in the collection of the Abby Aldrich Rockefeller Folk Art Museum, Colonial Williamsburg, Williamsburg, Virginia. Family tradition has it that the artist was living with the family of Dr. Thomas and Joanna (Terry) Armstrong when he created this carving of their daughter, Amanda (b. 1844). Inscription: "AMANDA C/ ARMSTRONG/ BORN MAY/ 26/ 1844/ BY A. AMES/ NOV 1847." Illustrated in Jack T. Ericson's "Asa Ames: Sculptor" in the magazine Antiques (September 1982).
- Study of a Hand Holding a Book - c. 1847 - 1849 - collection of John T. Ames, Austin, Texas. Possibly a study or a remnant of a lost work by Ames. Illustrated in Stacy C. Hollander's Asa Ames: Occupation Sculpturing (New York: American Folk Art Museum, 2008).
- Bust Portrait of a Young Man (Self-Portrait) - c. 1847 - 1851 - currently held in the collection of the Huntington Museum of Art, Huntington, West Virginia. This is almost certainly a self-portrait by Ames (based upon comparisons between the profiles of it, the bust carving depicted in the recently discovered daguerreotype and the image of Ames himself) or far less likely, a portrait of John Trowbridge Ames (1819 - 1902), the artist's brother. The daguerreotype was commented upon in 2015 at luminous-lint.com, a website devoted to 'Photography: History, Evolution and Analysis,' where the site noted: "Ames is shown sitting at the far left with a block of wood held between his knees. He is sculpting with a mallet and chisel, and a face is just beginning to emerge from the surrounding wood, a face eerily like his own: the artist carving a self-portrait." The addition of the doubly elaborate drapery and two tied bows surrounding its base along with its delicately carved and painted features, indicates this particular bust, more than others, was meant to be a showpiece, conveying the artist's technical abilities. Like the daguerreotype, the bust's rather diminutive size (just over 14 inches tall), meant that it, too, could have been brought to the homes of prospective clients to see in person. The unique circular, hollowed out space at the front of the sculpture, which may have been designed to hold the silver medal awarded to Ames at the New York State Fair in 1848, would have further impressed the artist's stature upon his potential clientele. The Huntington Museum acquired the carving in 1977 from Gene Harris Antiques Auction Center, located in Marshalltown, Iowa, not far from the town of Traer, Iowa, where John T. Ames, his family and Asa's widow, Emma, resided and were eventually buried (Buckingham Cemetery). Illustrated in Jack T. Ericson's "Asa Ames: Sculptor" in the magazine Antiques (September 1982); Stacy C. Hollander's "Asa Ames and the Art of Phrenology" in The Clarion (Summer 1989); Stacy C. Hollander's Asa Ames: Occupation Sculpturing (New York: American Folk Art Museum, 2008).
- Bust Portrait of a Woman - c. 1847 - 1851 - formerly in the collection of the Regis Corporation, 1982. In 2008, it was held in the collection of Curtis Galleries, Minneapolis, Minnesota. Illustrated in Jack T. Ericson's "Asa Ames: Sculptor" in the magazine Antiques (September 1982); Stacy C. Hollander's Asa Ames: Occupation Sculpturing (New York: American Folk Art Museum, 2008).
- Bust Portrait of a Young Woman - c. 1847 - 1851 - formerly in the collection of Edith Gregor Halpert, the New York art dealer. Now in the collection of the Abby Aldrich Rockefeller Folk Art Museum, Colonial Williamsburg, Williamsburg, Virginia. Thought to depict the artist's sister, Emeline Ames Dewey (1813 - 1883). Illustrated in Jack T. Ericson's "Asa Ames: Sculptor" in the magazine Antiques (September 1982); Stacy C. Hollander's Asa Ames: Occupation Sculpturing (New York: American Folk Art Museum, 2008).
- Full-Length Portrait of a Young Girl Holding a Book - c. 1847 - 1851 - collection of Seymour Knox in 1982. Inscription: "A. Ames." Originally discovered in the region of Buffalo, New York, its subject is currently unknown. Illustrated in Jack T. Ericson's "Asa Ames: Sculptor" in the magazine Antiques (September 1982).
- Full-Length Figure of a Young Boy - c. 1847 - 1851–present location unknown. The work was authenticated by Stacy C. Hollander and sold at the Rago Arts and Auction Center located in Lambertville, New Jersey in December 2018 and was originally discovered in the Buffalo, New York region c. 1998. It is unusual in having fully articulable arms.
- Bust Portrait of a Young Boy - c. 1848 - 1849–present location unknown. The identity of the subject is currently unknown. Illustrated in the recently discovered daguerreotype showing Asa Ames surrounded by some of his sculptures.
- Bust Portrait of a Young Girl - c. 1848 - 1849–present location unknown. The identity of the subject is current unknown. Illustrated in the recently discovered daguerreotype showing Asa Ames surrounded by some of his sculptures.
- Full-Length Portrait of a Naked Child - June 1849 - private collection. This work likely represents a likeness of the son of Dr. Harvey B. Marvin – LaRay Marvin (b. 1848). At the time this sculpture was carved, Ames was living with the family and young LaRay was seven months old. Inscription: "By A. Ames, Evans, N.Y., June 1849." Illustrated in Jack T. Ericson's "Asa Ames: Sculptor" in the magazine Antiques (September 1982); Stacy C. Hollander's Asa Ames: Occupation Sculpturing (New York: American Folk Art Museum, 2008).
- Full-Length Portrait of Susan Ames Hogue - December 1849 - currently held in the collection of the Boulder History Museum, gift of Mrs. Arch Hogue. Susan Ames Hogue was the artist's niece. Inscription: CARV'D Dec., 1849, "A. AME-." Illustrated in Laura Lee's "Carved by Asa Ames: A Chance Discovery" in the magazine Folk Art (Summer 2005).
- Doll - c. 1848 - 1850 - currently held in the private collection of Dorthy and Leo Rabkin, 1989, promised gift to the American Folk Art Museum. Smaller than his other figures, with fully articulable arms. Illustrated in Stacy C. Hollander's "Asa Ames and the Art of Phrenology" in The Clarion (Summer 1989).
- Full-Length Portrait Memorial for Sarah Reliance Ayer and Ann Augusta Ayer - April 1850 - currently held in the collection of the Wadsworth Atheneum, Hartford, Connecticut. Inscription: "By A. Ames. Carved APR 1850." The two girls depicted died in May 1849 at the respective ages of three and one. Illustrated in Jack T. Ericson's "Asa Ames: Sculptor" in the magazine Antiques (September 1982); Stacy C. Hollander's "Asa Ames and the Art of Phrenology" in The Clarion (Summer 1989); Stacy C. Hollander's Asa Ames: Occupation Sculpturing (New York: American Folk Art Museum, 2008).
- Bust of a Phrenological Head - c. 1850 - currently held in the collection of the American Folk Art Museum, bequest of Jeanette Virgin. Possibly made for Dr. Harvey B. Marvin. Illustrated in Jack T. Ericson's "Asa Ames: Sculptor" in the magazine Antiques (September 1982); Stacy C. Hollander's "Asa Ames and the Art of Phrenology" in The Clarion (Summer 1989); Stacy C. Hollander's Asa Ames: Occupation Sculpturing (New York: American Folk Art Museum, 2008).

== Bibliography ==
- Ericson, Jack T. “Asa Ames, sculptor." The Magazine Antiques, vol. 122, no. 3 (September 1982): 522–529.
- Hollander, Stacy C. “Asa Ames: New Discoveries,” The Magazine Antiques, vol. 174, no. 2 (August 2008).
- Hollander, Stacy C. Asa Ames: Occupation Sculpturing. New York: American Folk Art Museum, 2008.
- Hollander, Stacy C. “Asa Ames and the Art of Phrenology,” The Clarion, vol. 15, no. 3 (summer 1989), 28–35.
- Lee, Laura. “Carved by Asa Ames: A Chance Discovery,” Folk Art, vol. 30, no. 2 (Summer 2005).
- Patterson, Tom. “Asa Ames” in Encyclopedia of American Folk Art, edited by Gerard C. Wertkin. New York: Routledge, 2004.
- Smith, Roberta. “Filling in the Contours of a Surprising Golden Age.” The New York Times. April 25, 2008.
