= Samuel Folwell =

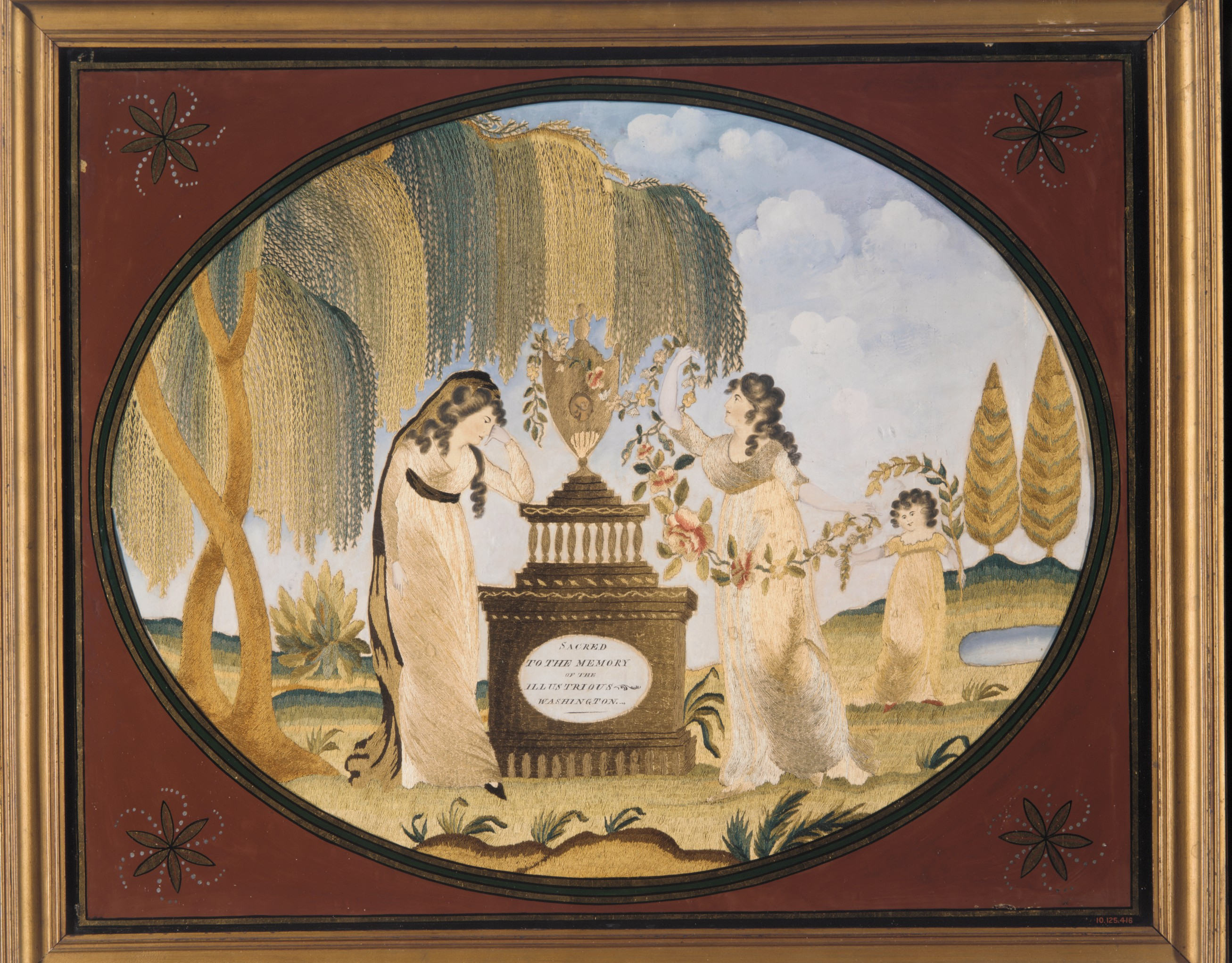
Embroidered Picture by Samuel Folwell, embroidered by Elizabeth Folwell's School. Metropolitan Museum of Art - Accession Number: 10.125.416

Samuel Folwell (1764–1813) was an American artist who worked in the 18th and 19th century. He is best known for creating works of mourning art which are pieces that memorialize loved ones and sometimes incorporate hair or mementos of the deceased.

Samuel and his wife, Ann Elizabeth Gebler Folwell, ran an art school for girls in Philadelphia. He often sketched works on silk after which girls attending the school would embroider over the designs. His works are in notable museums including the Metropolitan Museum of Art, the Museum of American Folk Art, Winterthur Museum, Garden, and Library, and the Yale University Art Gallery.
