= Stacy C. Hollander =

American art scholar and curator

- Education: Barnard College (BA); New York University (MFA)
- Occupation: Curator
- Organization: American Folk Art Museum (1985–2019)

Stacy C. Hollander is a scholar of American self-taught art and former American museum curator. She was the deputy director of curatorial affairs, chief curator, and director of exhibitions of the American Folk Art Museum. She also served as an interim director of the museum in 2018.

== Biography ==
Hollander received her B.A. from Barnard College, and her MA in American Folk Art Studies from New York University.

Hollander began working at the American Folk Art Museum (AFAM) in 1985 as graduate student and over her tenure at the AFAM, she organized nearly fifty original exhibitions for the museum, including Harry Lieberman: A Journey of Remembrance (1991), The Seduction of Light: Ammi Phillips/Mark Rothko Compositions in Pink, Green, and Red (2008), Compass: Folk Art in Four Directions (2012), and War and Pieced: The Annette Gero Collection of Quilts from Military Fabrics (2017). As director of exhibitions, she also helped acquire pieces by Ammi Phillips, Sheldon Peck, Joseph Whiting Stock, William Matthew Prior, and John Hewson.

In April 2019, Hollander stepped down from her post as chief curator of the AFAM after dedicating 34 years at the museum.
