= Reuben Moulthrop =

American artist

Reuben Moulthrop (1763–1814) was an early American artist based in East Haven, Connecticut. During his lifetime Moulthrop was famous for the wax figures that he arranged in tableaux (which at the time were so popular that they were even exported to the West Indies), but he is known to posterity through his portraits, which are in many important collections, including those of the American Folk Art Museum, the Detroit Institute of Art, the Metropolitan Museum of Art, and the New York Historical Society.

He was only twenty years old when the Revolutionary War ended: although his life spanned from colonial America to the new republic, his career coincided with the early decades of national independence. Though his earliest documented works, the portraits of Sarah and Job Perit in the Metropolitan Museum, date from 1790, earlier works, such as the portraits of Mary and James Reynolds in the American Folk Art Museum, have been attributed to the artist. Ezra Stiles, the president of Yale College from 1778 to 1795, praised Moulthrop as a "self taught painter" who "pleased with his genius", which suggests how esteemed Moulthrop's work was by the ruling class of the new republic, where there was as yet little art to see. Moulthrop's work thus contributed to the establishment of an early standard.

Moulthrop's work is an early example of the adaptation of the European form of portraiture to American realities; it testifies to the development of European-style bourgeois culture on the American frontier. Moulthrop's work evinces the influence of the Colonial painter John Durand, who had been active in East Haven as well as in New York and Virginia. In turn he was a likely influence on the Connecticut-born portraitist Ammi Phillips, whose namesake the Reverend Ammi Ruhamah Robbins was painted by Moulthrop. A retrospective devoted to Moulthrop's work at the Connecticut Historical Society in 1956–1957 revealed unlikely inconsistencies in the oeuvre attributed to Moulthrop. It is therefore difficult to assign works to Moulthrop with certainty.

== Gallery ==
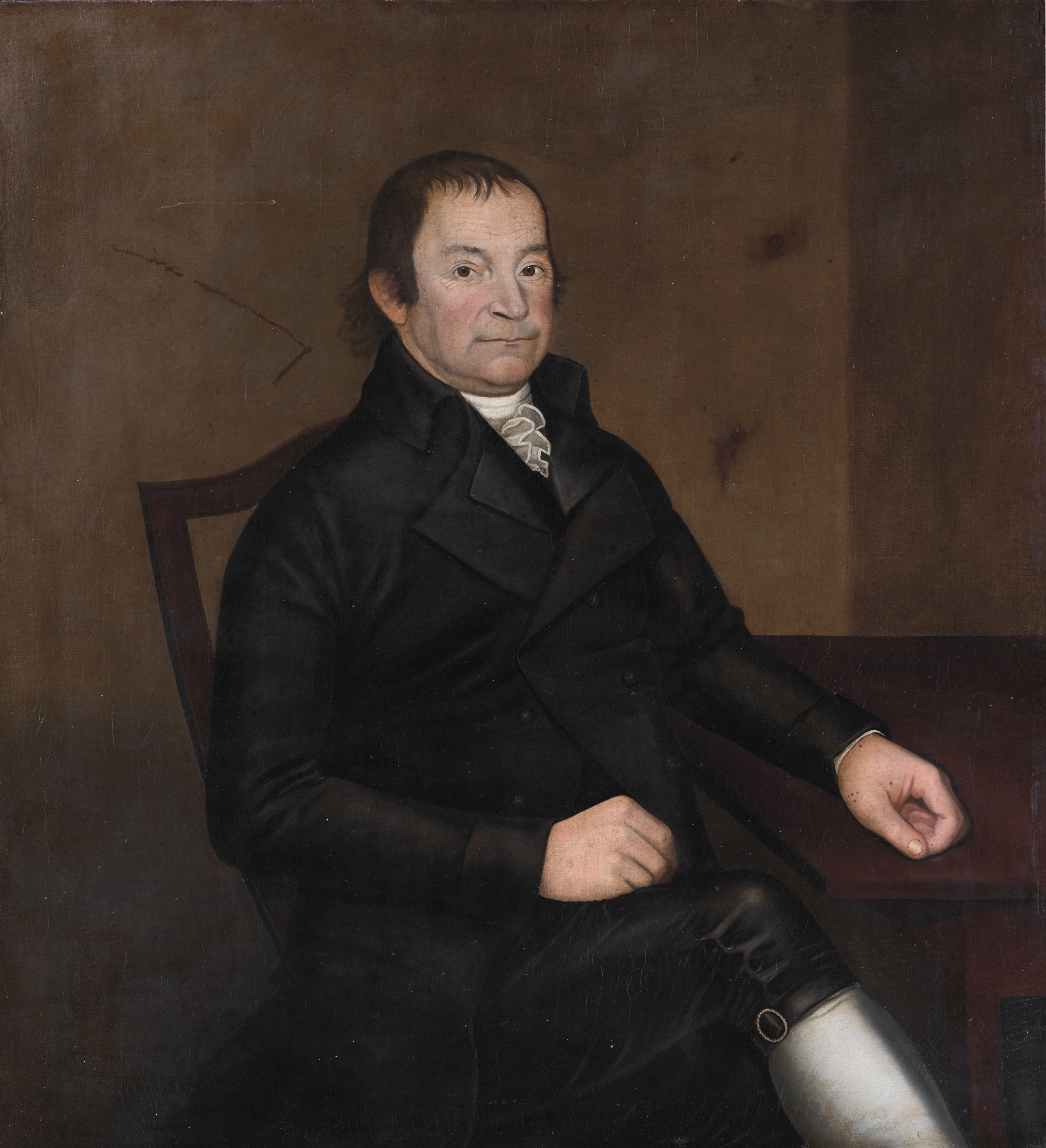
Timothy Atwater

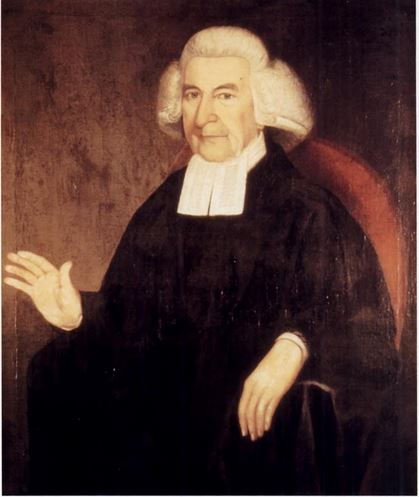
Ezra Stiles
