= Samuel Addison Shute and Ruth Whittier Shute =

Couple painters

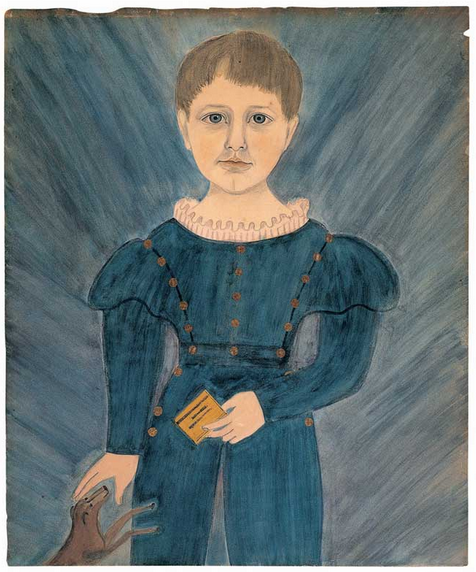
Frederick Buxton − painted c. 1831

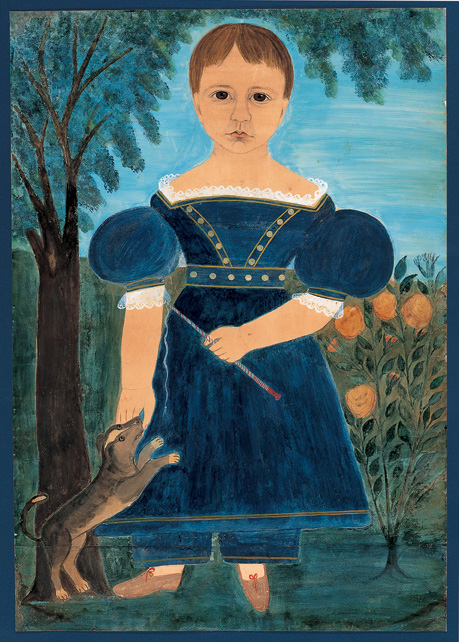
Master Burnham—painted c. 1831

Samuel Addison Shute (1803–1836) and Ruth Whittier Shute (1803–1882) were a husband and wife team of itinerant portrait painters active in New England and New York State during the 1830s. Ruth Whittier Shute continued painting through the 1870s.

== Early life ==
Samuel Addison Shute was born to Aaron and Betsy Poore Shute and lived in Byfield, Massachusetts. He had a sister, Adelaide Montgomery Shute, who was born disabled, and lived with her mother for the majority of her life. A third child, named Maria Antoinette Shute, was born in 1831, but died nine days after her birth. Aaron Shute died five years later in Champlain, New York, and both were buried in Concord, New Hampshire.

Samuel was a professional physician, a Freemason, and an orator as well as a painter. He attended the Governor Drummer Academy (now named The Governor's Academy) and then Dartmouth College to study medicine. Samuel Shute also delivered a Fourth of July speech in 1827 for Weare, New Hampshire. He married artist Ruth Whittier in 1827 in Dover, New Hampshire.

Ruth Whittier Shute was born to Sarah Austin and Obadiah Whittier, the eighth of nine children, and was the first cousin of the well known abolitionist and poet John Greenleaf Whittier.

The couple settled in Weare, New Hampshire, and a year later started painting as a couple. They traveled together as nomadic artists to locations such as New Hampshire, Massachusetts, New York, Vermont, and Rhode Island. Between 1827 and 1831, Samuel and Ruth painted separately, and periodically drew influences and ideas from each other, which led to collaborations between 1830 until 1833.

== Portraits ==
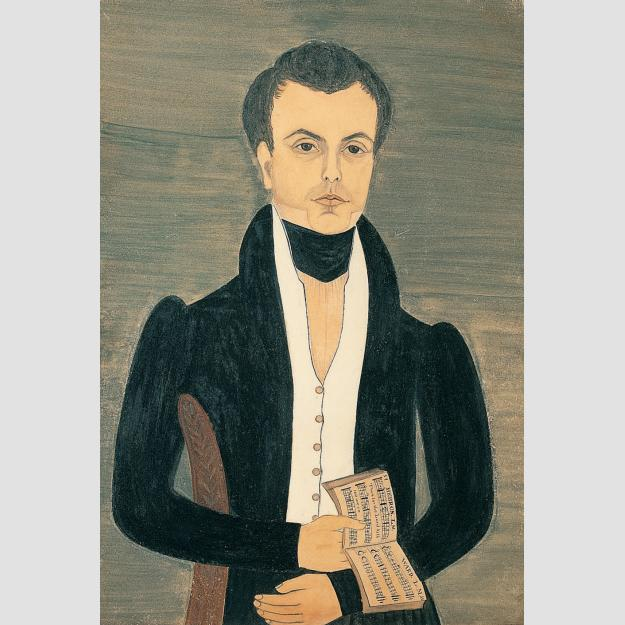
Josiah C. Burnham, mixed media, painted c. 1831–1832

Together they painted many portraits, some of which are now in notable collections, such as in the American Folk Art Museum and the Metropolitan Museum of Art.

Ralph Esmerian, a collector and supporter for the American Folk Art Museum, donated several watercolor pieces made by Samuel Addison and Ruth Whittier Shute. The subjects were men, women, and children, primarily workers of local textile mills in Lowell, Massachusetts and New Hampshire due to the influx of textile jobs that were available to locals. The couple would also set up in hotels and offer their services to possible clients and also placed ads in the local newspapers.

Ruth Shute would create the underlying drawing of the subject, while Samuel Shute would then paint the image using either watercolor or oil paint as the medium. Sometimes this would be denoted on the signature that was found on the back of their paintings in order to identify their separate contributions to the work: “Drawn by R. W. Shute/ and/ Painted by S. A. Shute.”.

Many of their portraits depict young working-class women who had migrated from their rural family homes to work in the textile mills that were then a strong part of the industrial economy of New England.

Samuel Addison Shute fell ill around the year 1834, which led the couple to move to Champlain, New York. Ruth Addison Shute decided to start painting on her own, using pastels and oil paint as a primary medium. She also still traveled within New York, setting up in hotels and painting miniature portraits for the locals. When her husband died in 1836, while still in his early 30s, Ruth Whittier Shute later remarried to Alpha Tarbel and moved to Lexington, Kentucky, where she had two daughters and continued to paint for another 45 years until her death in 1882.

== Style ==
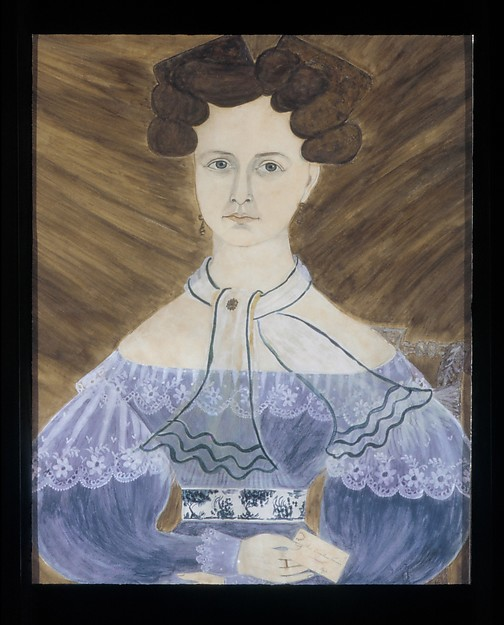
Miss Emeline Parker of Lowell, Massachusetts, mixed media, painted c. 1832.

The Shutes were known for their particular art style, which included emphasis on the decorative elements of the subject's appearance, which included clothing, hair, and jewelry. Along with watercolor and oil, the couple would use pastels, collage, gouache, and even gold foil. They were also able to capture expressive and emotional facial expressions with these media.

The faces have a great amount of detail when compared against the subject's body and clothing, which was a common theme within the couple's portraits. When the face is rendered this way, it gives the viewer a sense of emotion and feeling from the subject. These details found within the face correlate with the intricacies found within the garments when they contained lace or a decorative print. The shoulders of the female subjects angle downward sharply, elongating the figures. Typical to these portraits, the sleeves of the garments appear oversized and rounded compared to the arms, which could appear thin, especially on a male figure. On many of their male and female figures, the torso is short and the waist can be pinched inward, giving the body an hourglass shape. The backgrounds of these portraits contain intense strokes of watercolor that contain various mixes of blues, greens, and browns. The women's hair was commonly stylized in brown rolls, simulating pinned curls. On the contrary, the males’ hair was commonly short.

Some subjects can be found sitting, standing, and holding certain objects, relating to the subject in general. For example, a subject could be holding a book, which could represent their intelligence, and decorative elements found on the subject's chair could represent their knowledge and appreciation of current fashion trends and home décor.

== See also ==
- 19th-century American painters
