= Ammi Phillips =

American painter

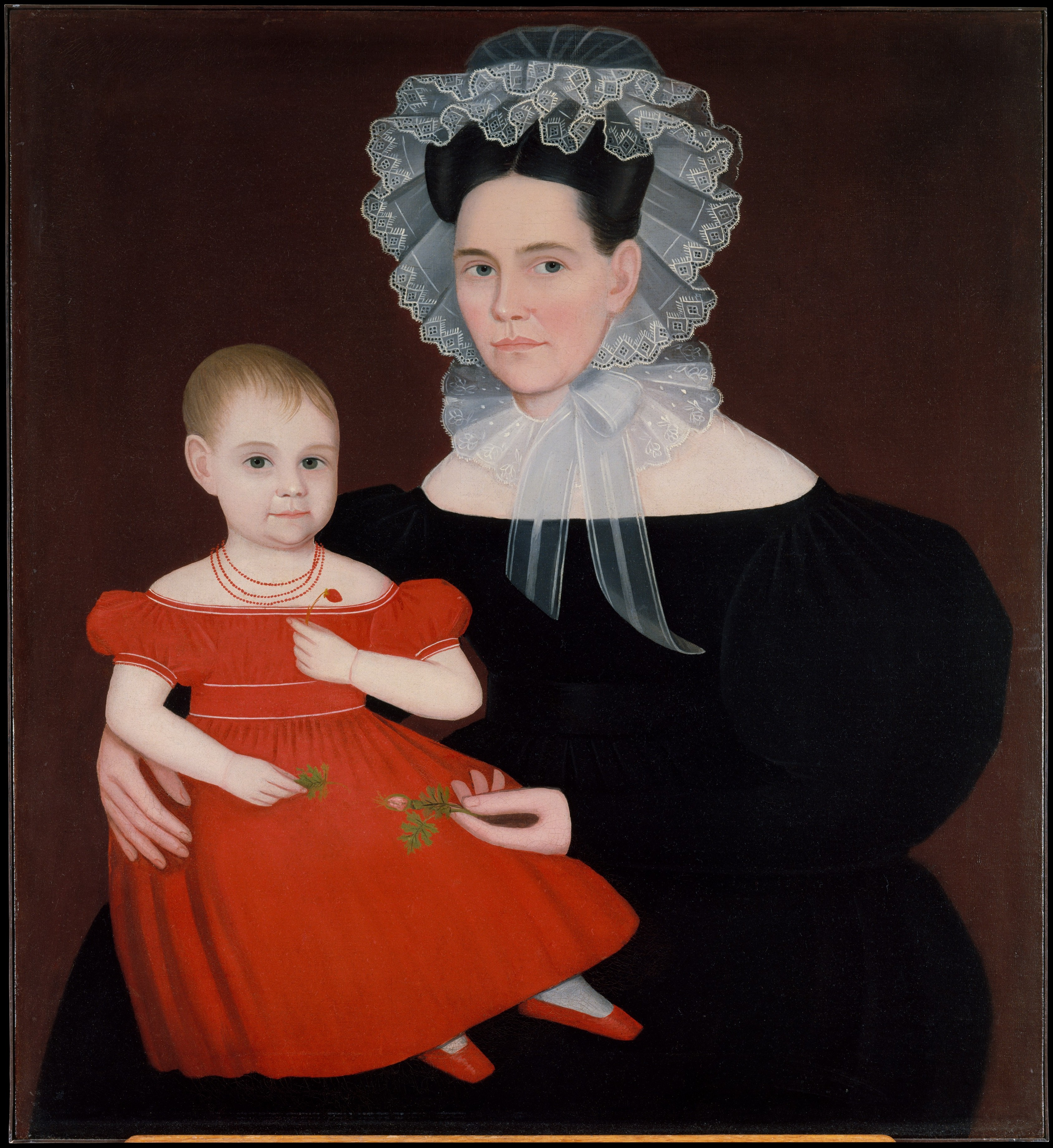
Mrs. Mayer and Daughter, 1835–1840, Metropolitan Museum of Art

Ammi Phillips (April 24, 1788 – July 11, 1865) was a prolific American itinerant portrait painter active from the mid 1810s to the early 1860s in Connecticut, Massachusetts, and New York. His artwork is identified as folk art, primitive art, provincial art, and itinerant art without consensus among scholars, pointing to the enigmatic nature of his work and life. He is attributed to over eight hundred paintings, although only eleven are signed.

While his paintings are formulaic in nature, Phillips paintings were under constant construction, evolving as he added or discarded what he found successful, while taking care to add personal details that spoke to the identity of those who hired him. He is most famous for his portraits of children in red, although children only account for ten percent of his entire body of work. The most well known of this series, Girl in Red Dress with Cat and Dog, sold in 1985 for one million dollars, a first for folk art. His paintings hung mostly unidentified, spare for some recognition in the collections like those of Edward Duff Balken, for decades until his oeuvre was reconstructed by Barbara Holdridge and Larry Holdridge, collectors and students of American folk art, with the support of the art historian Mary Black. Ammi Phillips's body of work was expanded by their discovery that the mysterious paintings of a "Kent Limner" and "Border Limner" were indeed his.

== Early life ==
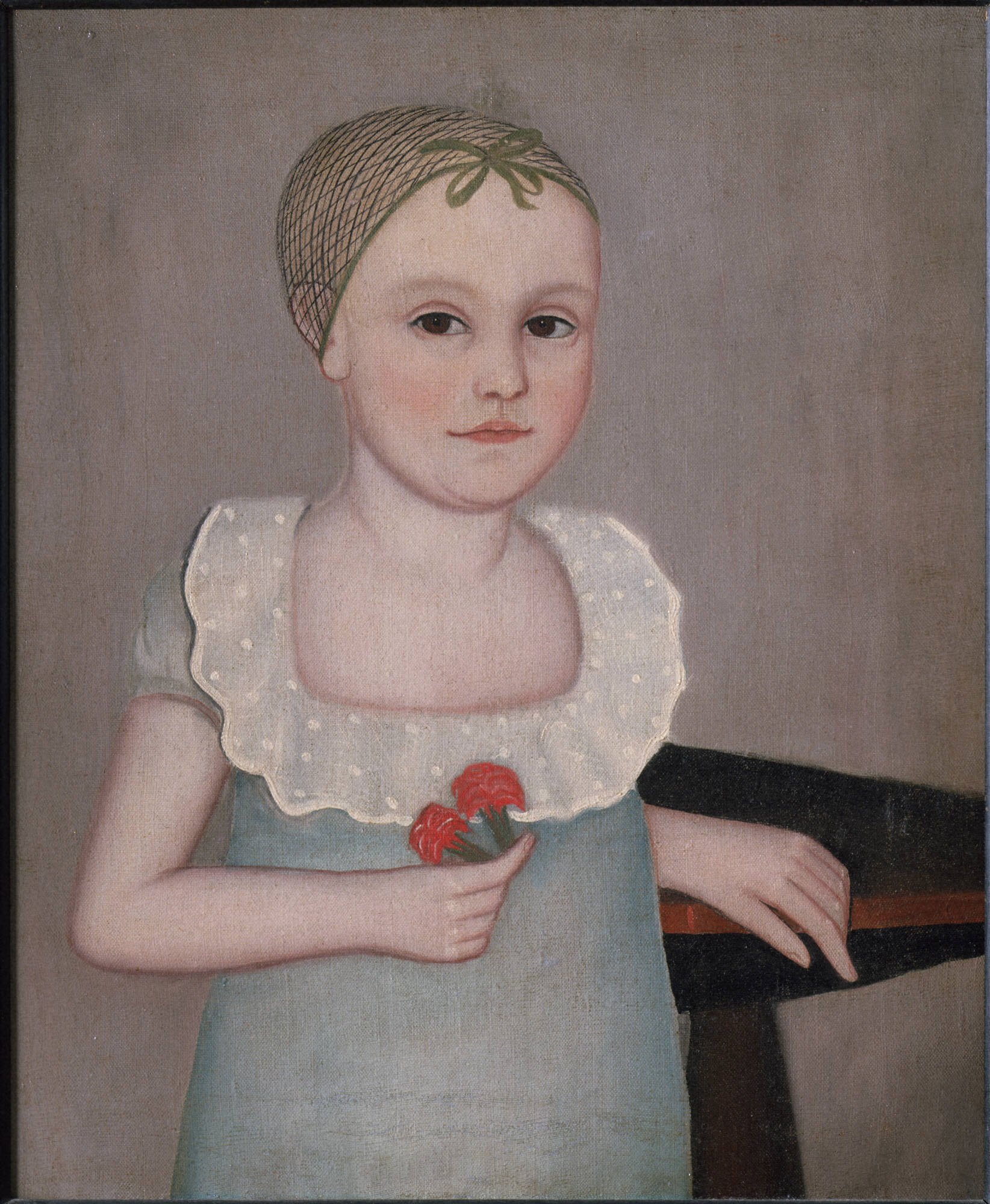
Henrietta Door, 1814, Princeton University Art Museum, an example of Phillips's earlier work

Phillips was born in Colebrook, Connecticut, on April 24, 1788, to Samuel Phillips (1760–1842), a farmer by trade and veteran of the Revolutionary war, and is wife Millea Phillips (1763–1861), one of eleven children, beginning a life that spanned the period from George Washington's presidency to the American Civil War.

The name "Ammi" (in full, "Ammiruhamah") is biblical. It was typically used in the 17th and 18th centuries by Congregationalists. Other bearers include Ammi Ruhamah Cutter and Ammi Ruhamah Mitchell.

Phillips moved out of his family home at some point before 1810, and the first signed portraits produced by Phillips date from 1811, meaning he was by then beginning his career as a portrait painter.

== Personal life ==
On March 18, 1813, Phillips married Laura Brockway in Nassau, New York. Her family had roots in Sharon, Connecticut. Ammi and Lauren Phillips had four sons: Henry, George, William, and Russell Phillips—and one unknown daughter, although the order in which they had them is unclear, and one may not have survived. Laura Brockway died February 2, 1830, at the age of 38, and five months later Phillips married secondly Jane Ann Caulkins, who was twenty years his junior. Jane would have four more children: Anna, Jane, Samuel, and Sarah Phillips, but Sarah was to die at the age of four and a half.

Ammi Phillips reported he and his family living in a different residence in every recorded census. In 1820, he reported living in Troy, New York. He sold this property in 1828, moving to a forty-five acre property in Rhinebeck, New York. This land would be sold in part to its original owner as well as his brother-in-law, and the family moved yet again inside the State of New York to a one-acre property in Amenia. In the 1850 census, Phillips is recorded for the first time under the profession of portrait painter, now living in North East, New York. In 1855 he was recorded as "artist", and was living in New Marlborough, Massachusetts. In 1860 and 1865 he was living in Curtisville (now Interlaken), Stockbridge, Massachusetts.

== Career ==
It is unknown whether Ammi Phillips was entirely self taught, or had interacted or been taught by other artists in the Colebrook, Connecticut, area. There were such painters whose work Phillips might have seen while growing up. Rueben Moulthrop, Nathaniel Wales, Uriah Brown, and Samuel Broadbent are all artists traced by documents to the area, and stylistic elements of their work can be seen in Phillips's early paintings. He enters the documentary record as an artist himself in 1809, at the age of 21, with advertisements in both The Berkshire Reporter and a Pittsfield, Massachusetts, tavern, proclaiming his talent for painting "correct likenesses" distinguished by “perfect shadows and elegantly dressed in the prevailing fashions of the day.” Although Phillips also advertised his talent for "fancy painting, silhouettes, sign and ornamental painting", he soon specialized as a portraitist. Phillips was recorded in the diary of Dr. Samuel Barstow of Great Barrington, Massachusetts, dated October 6, 1811, mentioning small portraits he had commissioned of himself and his wife. Phillips's work satisfied the local standard, and within two years he was receiving regular portrait commissions from community leaders in this area of western Massachusetts. Phillips's earliest recorded portraits are of the Rev. and Mrs. Ephraim Judson and Gideon Smith of Stockbridge, Massachusetts, in 1811. Gideon Smith was an innkeeper and displayed his portrait in his tavern, implying that instead of a struggling painter trying to make ends meet, Phillips may have been quite business savvy.

Unlike Phillips' illustrious predecessors in American art, such as Benjamin West of Philadelphia and John Singleton Copley of Boston, Phillips lived and worked not in established city centers, but new territories opening up throughout New England and the Mid-Atlantic. Though he was able to successfully market his skills from a young age, it's likely that the relatively sparse demand for painted portraits, a luxury good, was the main factor necessitating an itinerant career that saw the artist move regularly, family perhaps in tow, between western Massachusetts, Connecticut, and the Hudson River Valley. The artist moved on as he exhausted the demand of the local community for painted "likenesses". This wandering lifestyle is archetypically Romantic, rather contrasting with the bourgeois domesticity of his portraits, which are almost always set within interiors. A letter from the American artist John Vanderlyn to his nephew, John Vanderlyn, Jr., from Kingston, New York, dated September 9, 1825, stated, "Were I to begin life again, I should not hesitate to follow this plan, that is, to paint portraits cheap and slight, for the mass of folks can't judge of the merits of a well finished picture, I am more and more persuaded of this. Indeed, moving about through the country as Phillips did and probably still does, must be an agreeable way of passing ones time. I saw four of his works at Jacobus Hardenburgh's the other day painted a year or two ago, which seemed to satisfy them." Such comments from a well established academic painter such as Vanderlyn positions Phillips not as a wandering peddler of art, but instead as an artist with social and economic importance. This is also visible in his clientele, which consisted of judges, doctors and business owners.

This supercilious opinion of Phillips's artistic worth can be contrasted with the conclusion of the twentieth-century art critic Hilton Kramer, who wrote in The New York Times in 1970, "In the Plain and Fancy exhibition, for example, there are five portraits by the amazing Ammi Phillips (1788–1865), and at least two of them—the portraits of Mrs. Isaac Cox and of Deacon Benjamin Benedict (both about 1836)—are of superb quality. To the modern eye, the portrait of Mrs. Cox particularly speaks with a clarity, precision, and sympathy that places it considerably nearer to our own standards of artistic probity than anything to be found in the common run of 'serious' painting at the time. If this is 'innocent' painting, it is innocent only of those flatulent academic pretensions which remained the curse of so much of our art in the 19th century."

Phillips lived into the era of the daguerreotype, and his last portraits show this influence.

== Death ==
Phillips died on July 11, 1865, at his home in Curtisville, just outside Stockbridge, where his death certificate is filed in the Town Hall. His body was buried in Amenia, New York. His extensive, continuously evolving body of artwork over a period of five decades provided posterity with a vast archive of early American self-fashioning.

== Girl in Red Dress with Cat and Dog ==
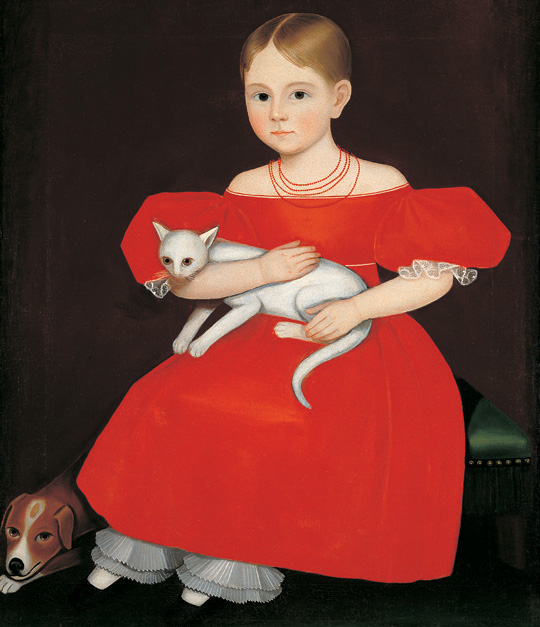
Ammi Phillips, Girl in Red Dress with Cat and Dog, 1830-1835

Phillips's most famous work is Girl in Red Dress with Cat and Dog, which is in the collection of the American Folk Art Museum in New York. In 1985 it was purchased for the museum at one million dollars, a first for folk art. The painting is one of a group of four portraits of children in vibrant red with a dog on the floor that Phillips produced while living in Dutchess County, New York, in the mid-1830s.

The image is frequently reproduced and admired. It was featured on a United States postage stamp in 1998. Nicholas B.A. Nicholson wrote a novel told from the perspective of the depicted girl.

Ken Johnson, an art critic for The New York Times, has repeatedly praised the picture. In a review of the American Folk Art Museum's exhibition Self-Taught Genius, Johnson contends that Girl in Red Dress with Cat and Dog is "one of the most beautiful paintings made by any American artist ever." Previously he described the work as "heartbreakingly lovely."

The novelist and art historian Teju Cole, in the third chapter of his debut novel Open City, describes a visit to the American Folk Art Museum. The narrator notices and evaluates Girl in Red Dress with Cat and Dog: "At the landing of the first flight of stairs, I saw an oil portrait of a young girl in a starchy red dress holding a white cat. A dog peeked out from under her chair. The details were saccharine, but they could not obscure the force and beauty of the painting."

== Rediscovery and reconstruction of work ==
Phillips's modern rediscovery began in 1924, when a group of portraits of women, shown leaning forward in three-quarter view and wearing dark dresses, were displayed in an antique show in Kent, Connecticut. The anonymous painter of these strongly colored works, which dated from the 1830s, became known as the "Kent Limner", after the locality where they had come to light.

Stylistically distinct from those of the "Kent Limner", a second group of early-19th-century paintings emerged after 1940 in the area near the Connecticut–New York border. Attributed at the time to an unknown "Border Limner", these works, dating from the period 1812–1819, were characterized by soft pastel hues and limited drawing skills, as seen in the portraits of Mrs. Russell Dorr and Baby, now in the Abby Aldrich Rockefeller Folk Art Collection, Williamsburg, Virginia, and of Harriet Leavens, now in the Fogg Art Museum, Harvard University.

It was not until 1958 that Ammi Phillips's identity as the painter of both groups of portraits was established by Barbara and Larry Holdridge, and endorsed by Mary Black, writing on May 21, 1959, to three fellow folk-art historians, "You are the ones who should be the first to know that I have joined the opposition [i.e., the Holdridges] and now believe that the Border Limner, Ammi Phillips, A. Phillips, and the Kent Limner are one and the same person." Additional works were identified, showing the artist's transition from the delicate coloration of the Border period to the bold and dramatic works that followed. Some paintings that had previously been attributed to John Bradley were also identified as the work of Ammi Phillips. By 1976, there were approximately 400 paintings securely attributed to Phillips, who is now recognized as one of the most prolific American folk painters of his time. Scores more have been discovered since then.

The art historian Mary Black said Phillips's early and late styles reveal the untrained artist's inventiveness in dealing with the difficulty of representing the figure: "In his Border period he made his limitations work for him and the lumpy coats, gangling limbs, huge hands, wooden arms—even the tables tilted at crazy angles—were all part of well-composed and beautiful portraits. Later he glossed over problems with anatomy by using flat dark-colored backgrounds and dark dresses and suits". Phillips's work influenced the style of his younger contemporary, Erastus Salisbury Field, who worked as an itinerant portrait painter in the region just east of Phillips.

The Museum of American Folk Art showed its first major exhibition devoted to the work of a single folk portraitist to "Ammi Phillips, Portrait Painter 1788–1865," on exhibit from October 16 to December 2, 1968.

Phillips's work was displayed alongside the American modernist painter Mark Rothko in a 2008 exhibition "Seduction of Light" at the American Folk Art Museum, drawing attention to parallels of style and technique in the work of two American masters.

== Gallery ==
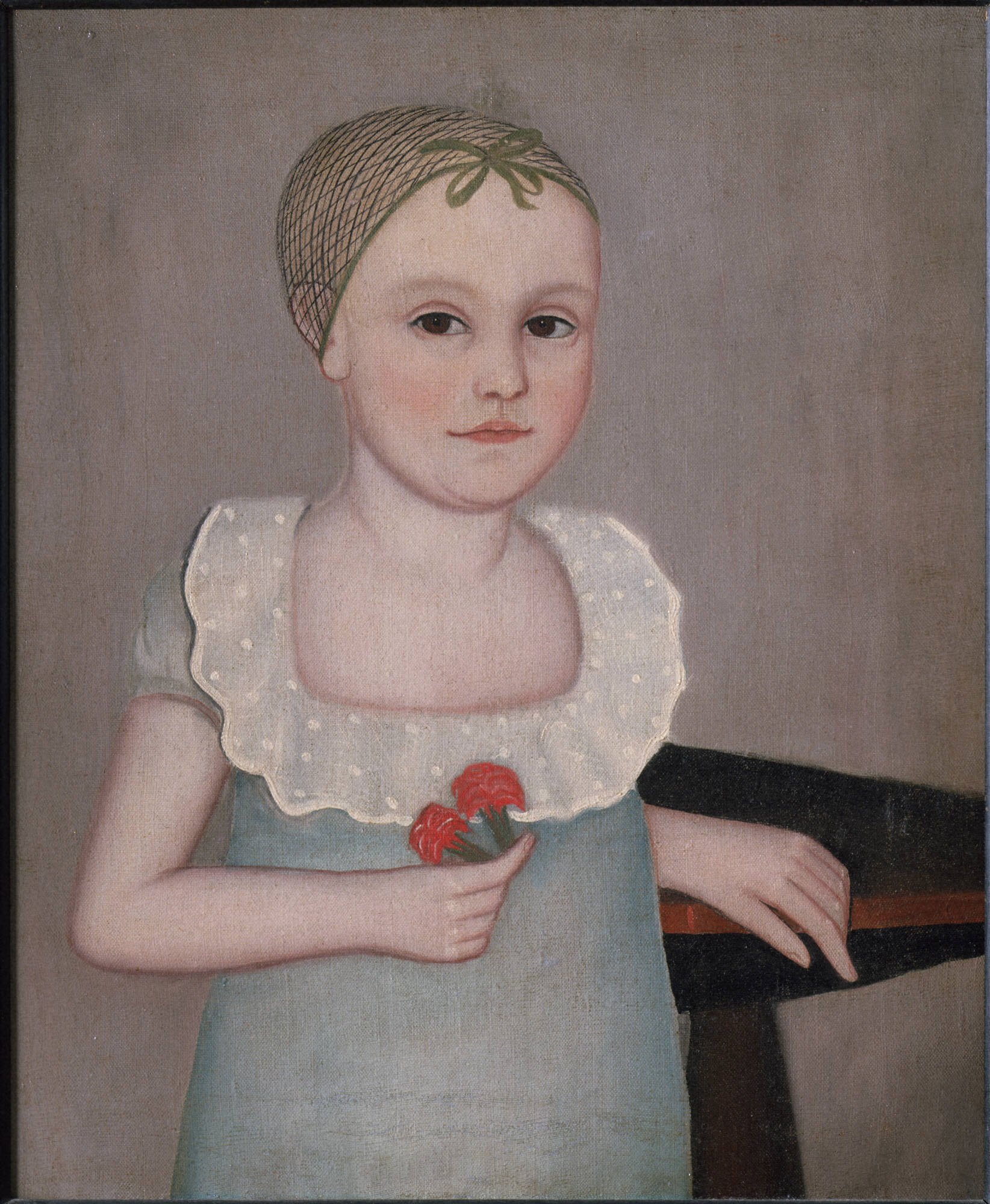
Henrietta Dorr, ca. 1814, Princeton University Art Museum

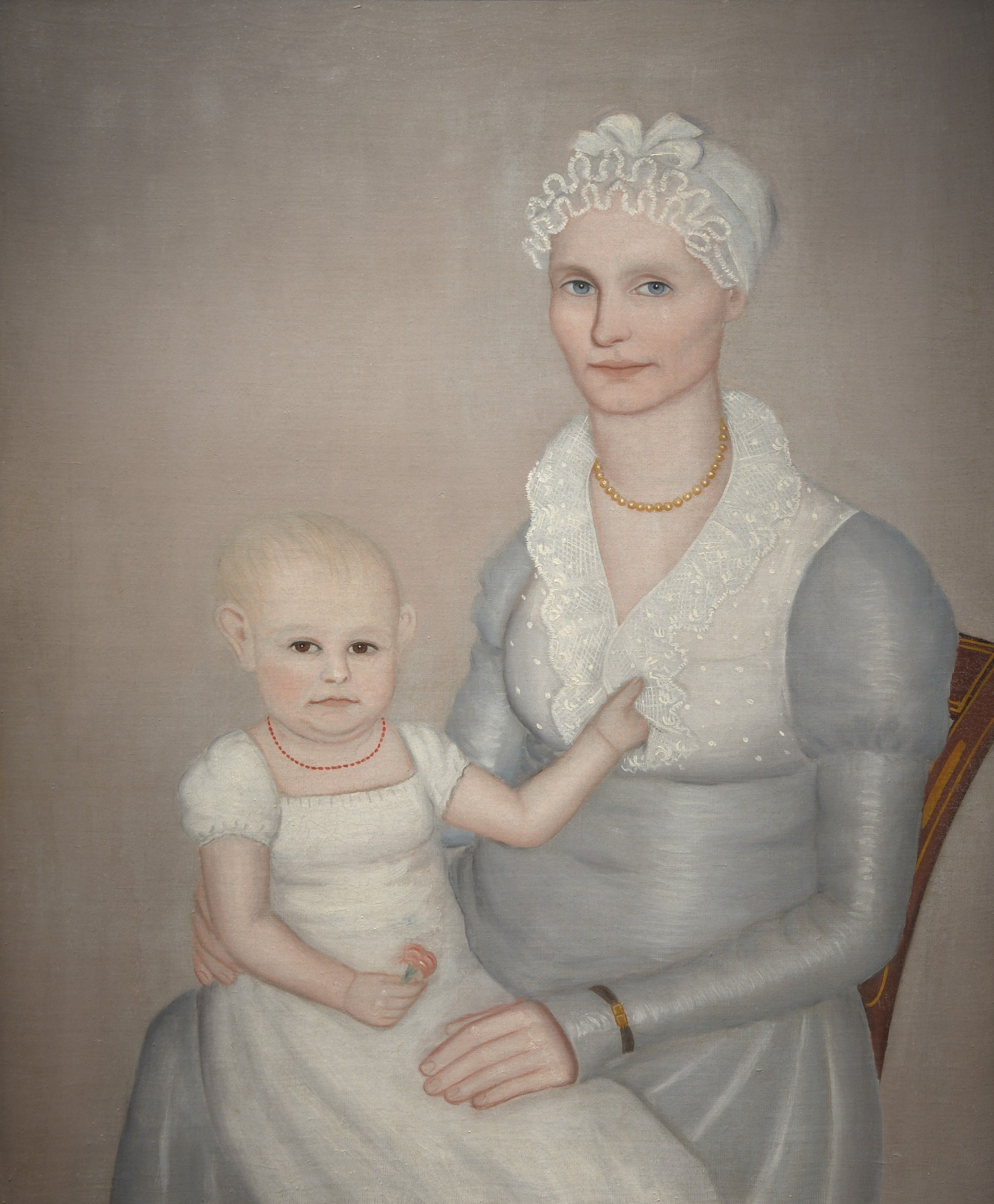
Mrs. Wilbur Sherman and daughter Sarah, 1815, Yale University Art Gallery

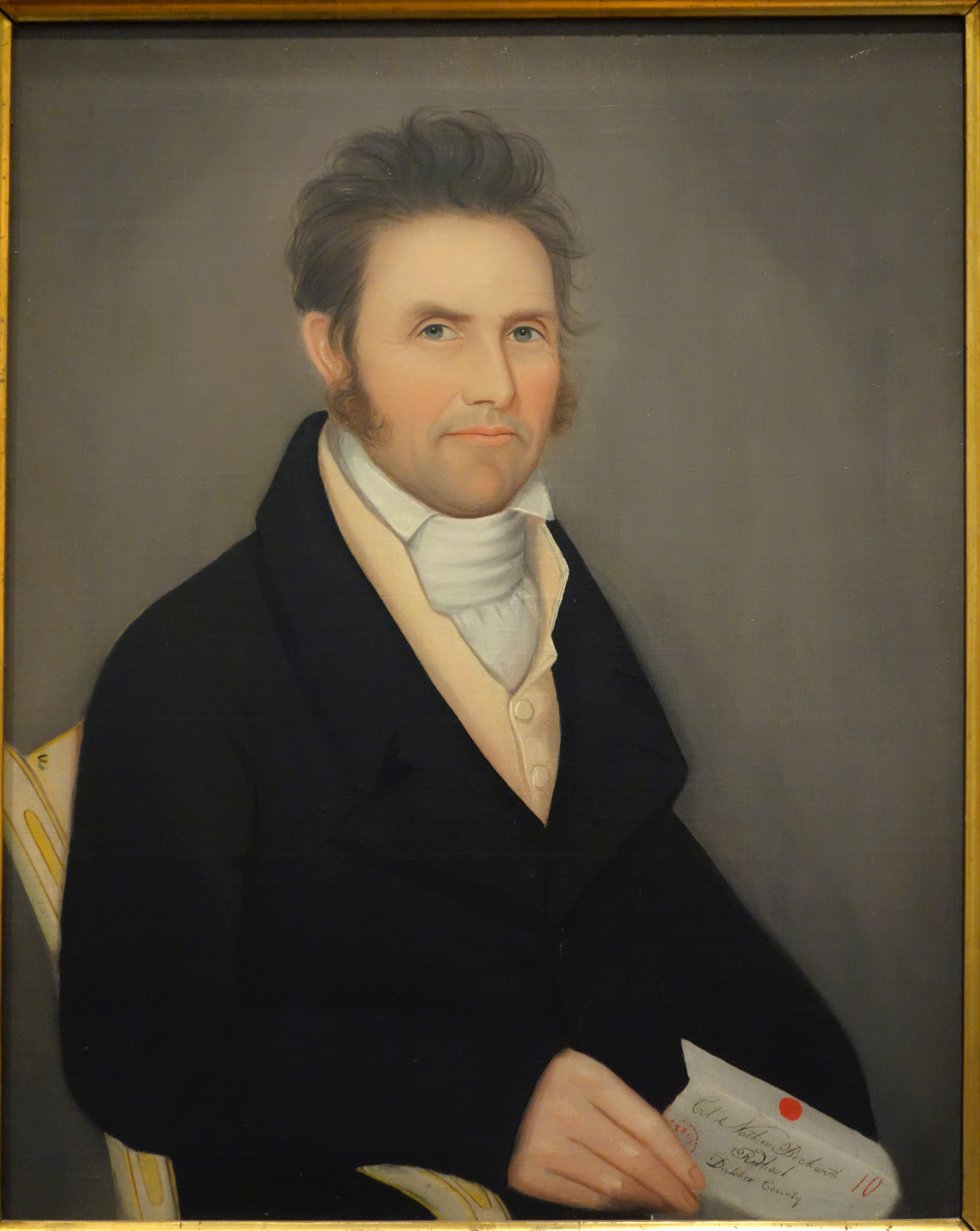
Colonel Nathan Beckwith, ca. 1817, Brooklyn Museum

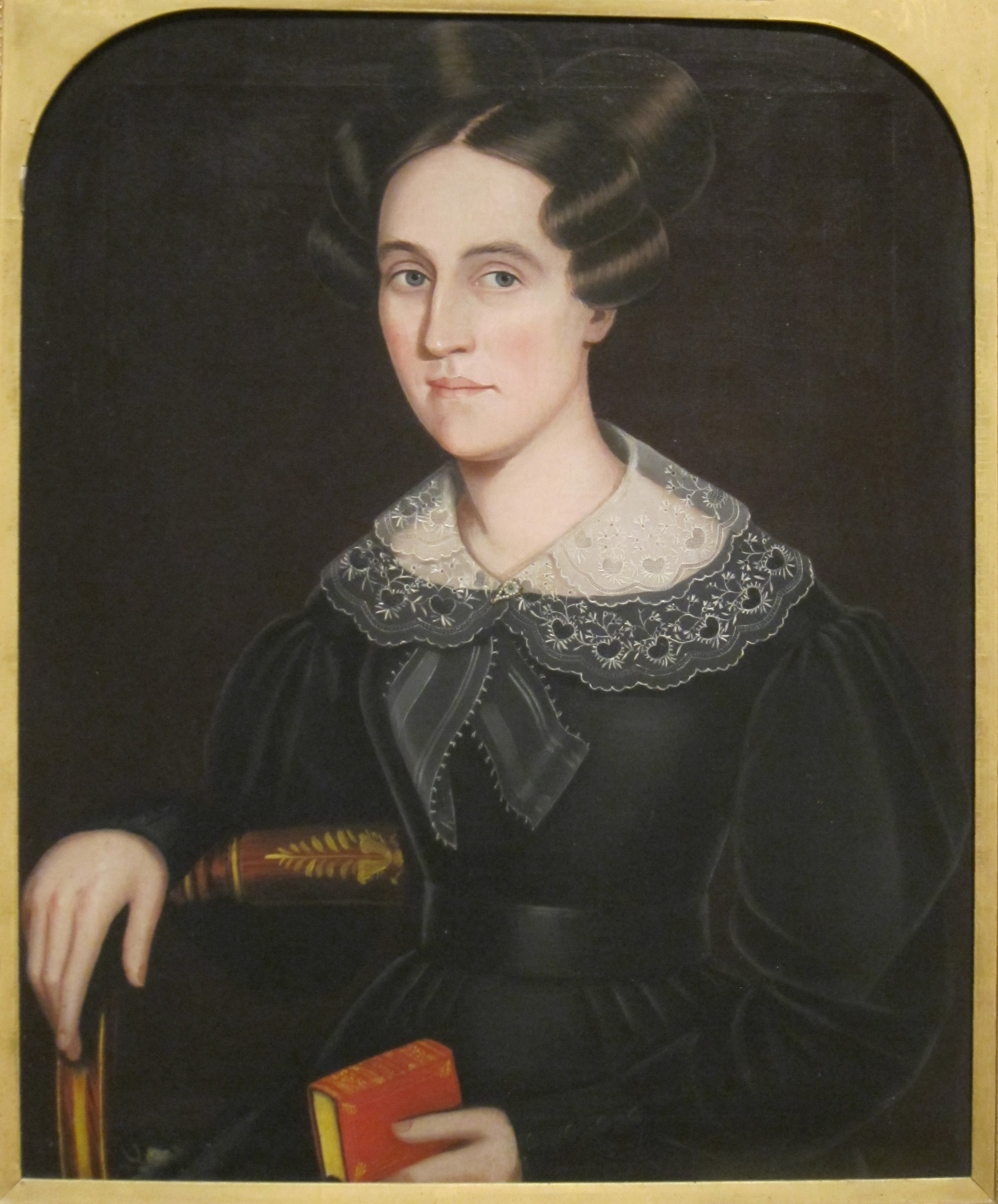
Mrs. Charles Westley Powers, 1829

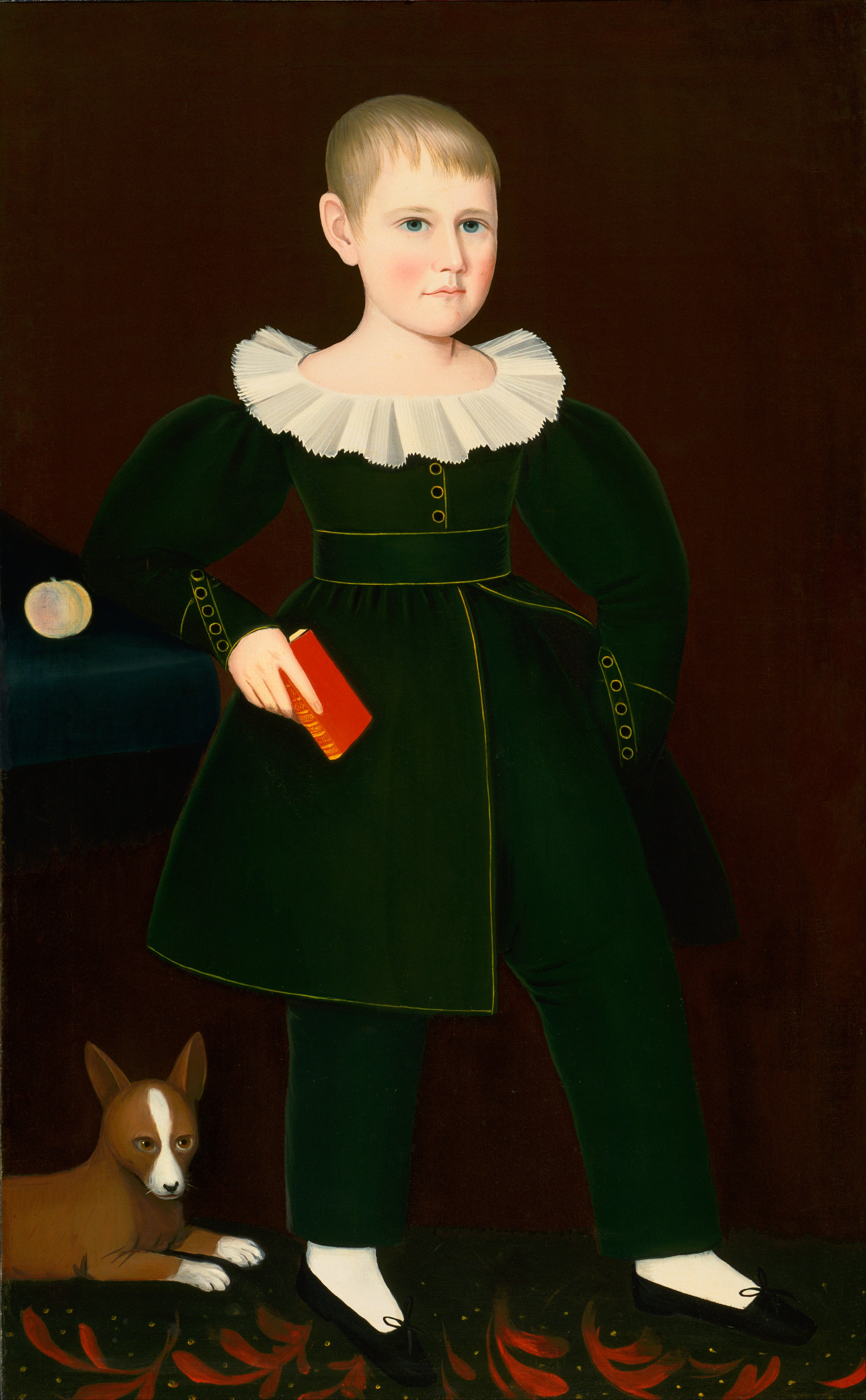
Blond Boy with Primer, Peach, and Dog, c. 1836, Philadelphia Museum of Art

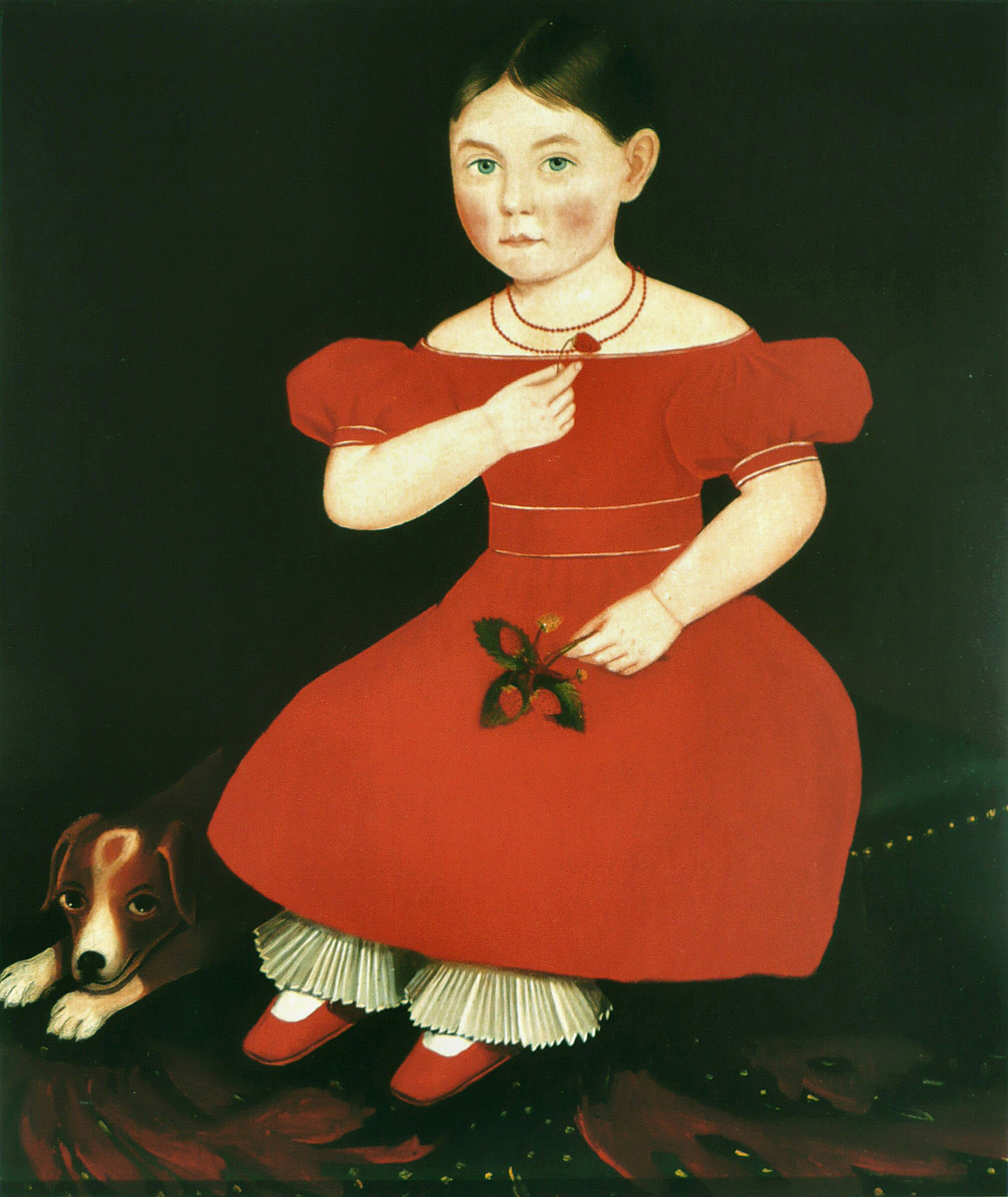
Girl in a Red Dress, c. 1835, Terra Foundation for American Art, Daniel J. Terra Collection

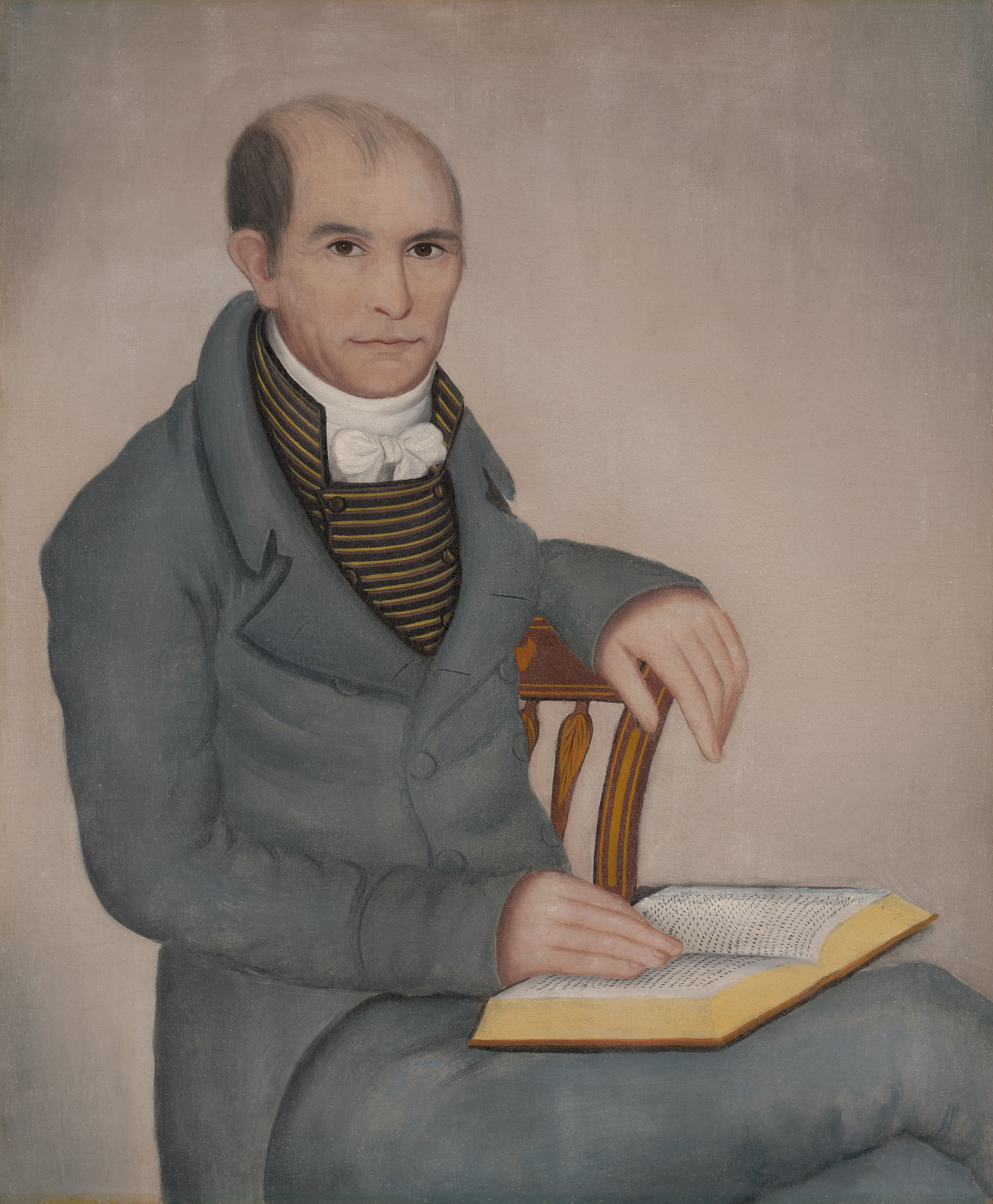
Wilbur Sherman, 1815, Yale University Art Gallery

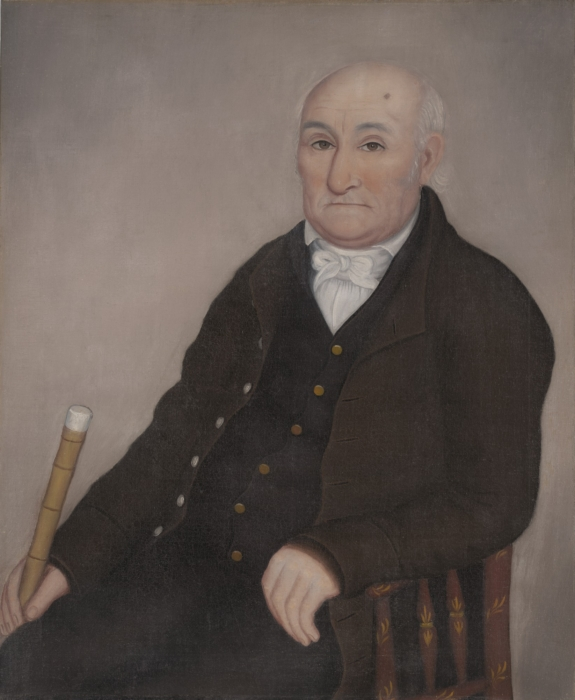
Caleb Sherman, 1815, Yale University Art Gallery

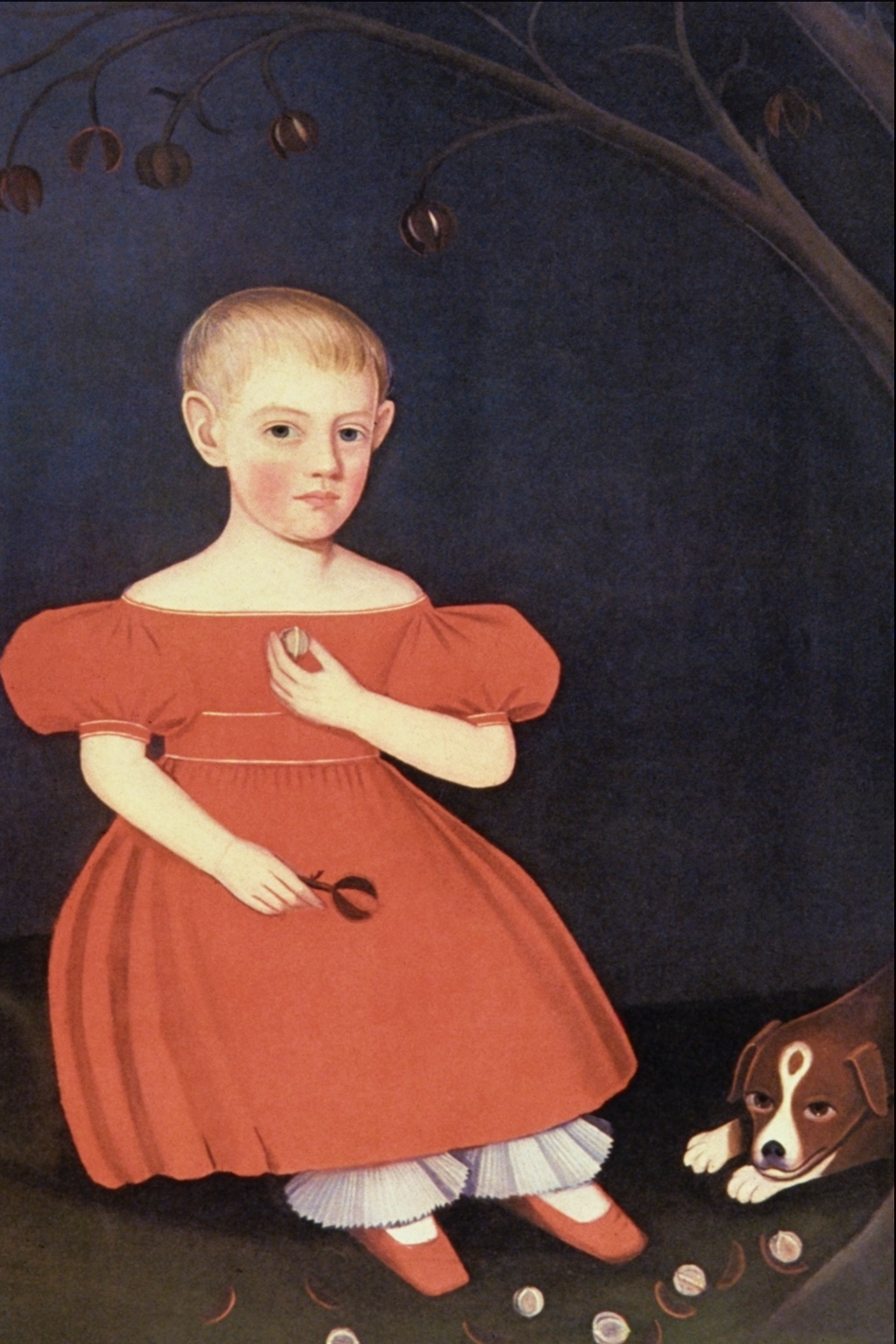
Andrew Jackson Ten Broeck, 1834, Private Collection

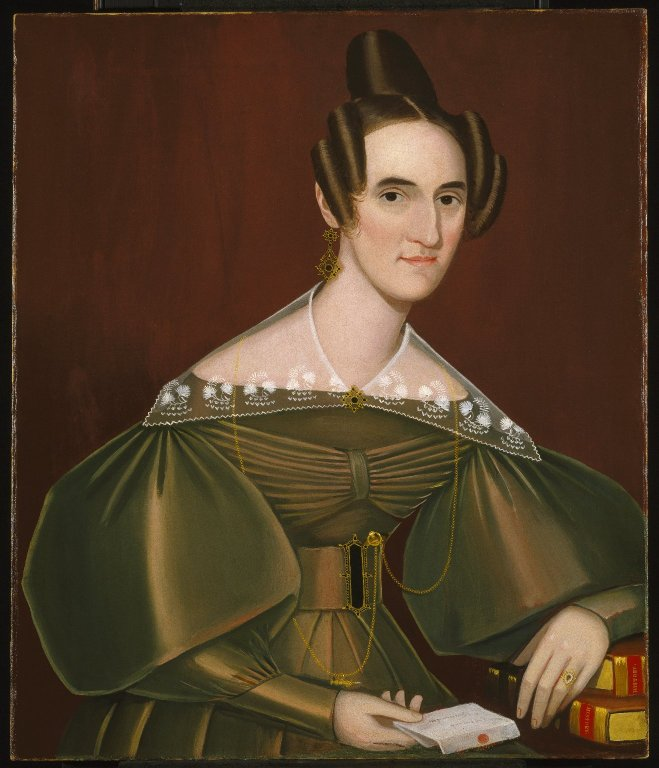
Jeannette Woolley, Later Mrs. John Vincent Storm, 1838, Brooklyn Museum

Portrait of Mrs. Robinson, 1819 Smithsonian American Art Museum

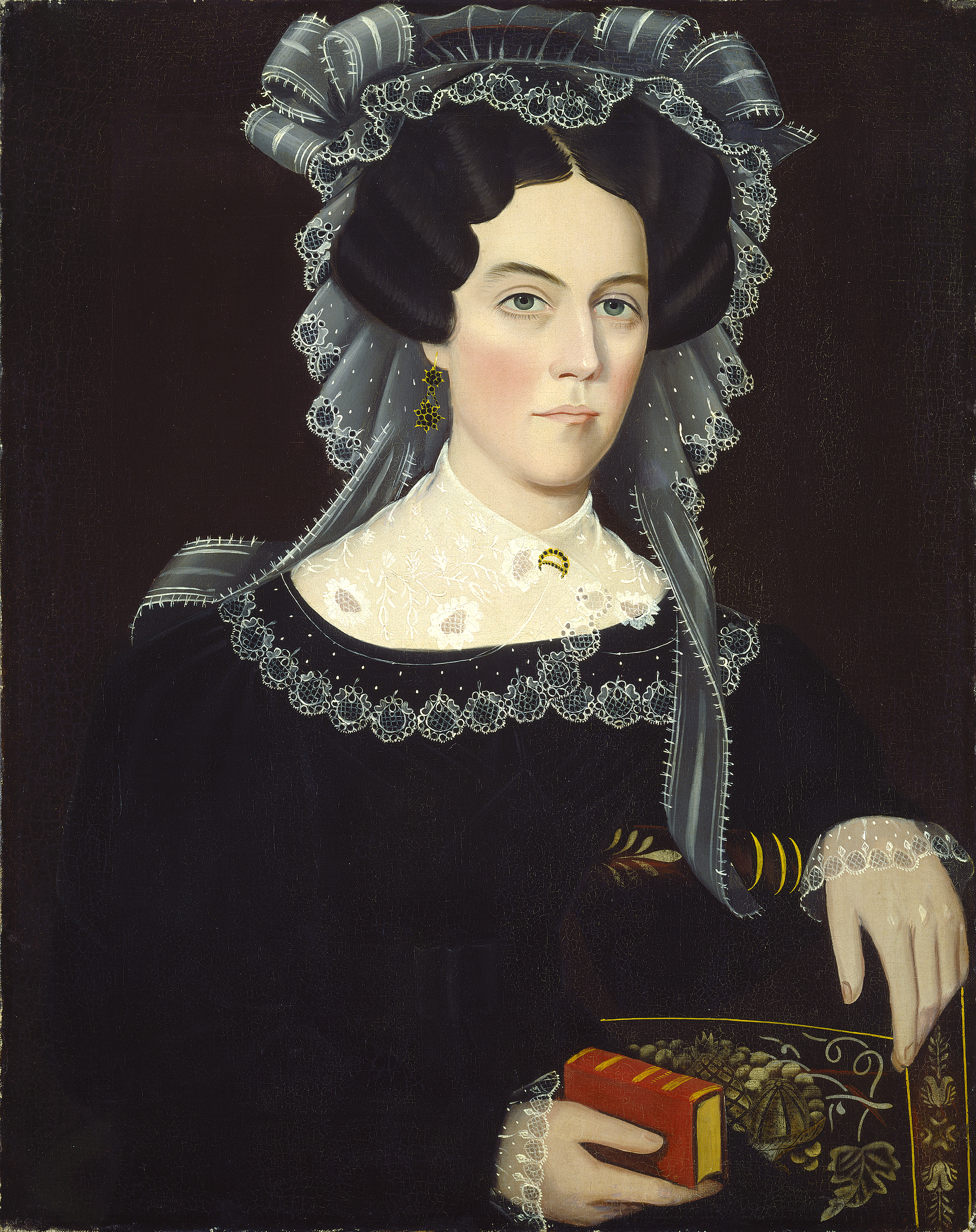
Catherine A. May, 1830, National Gallery of Art
