= American Folk Art Museum =

Museum in Manhattan, New York

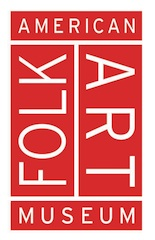

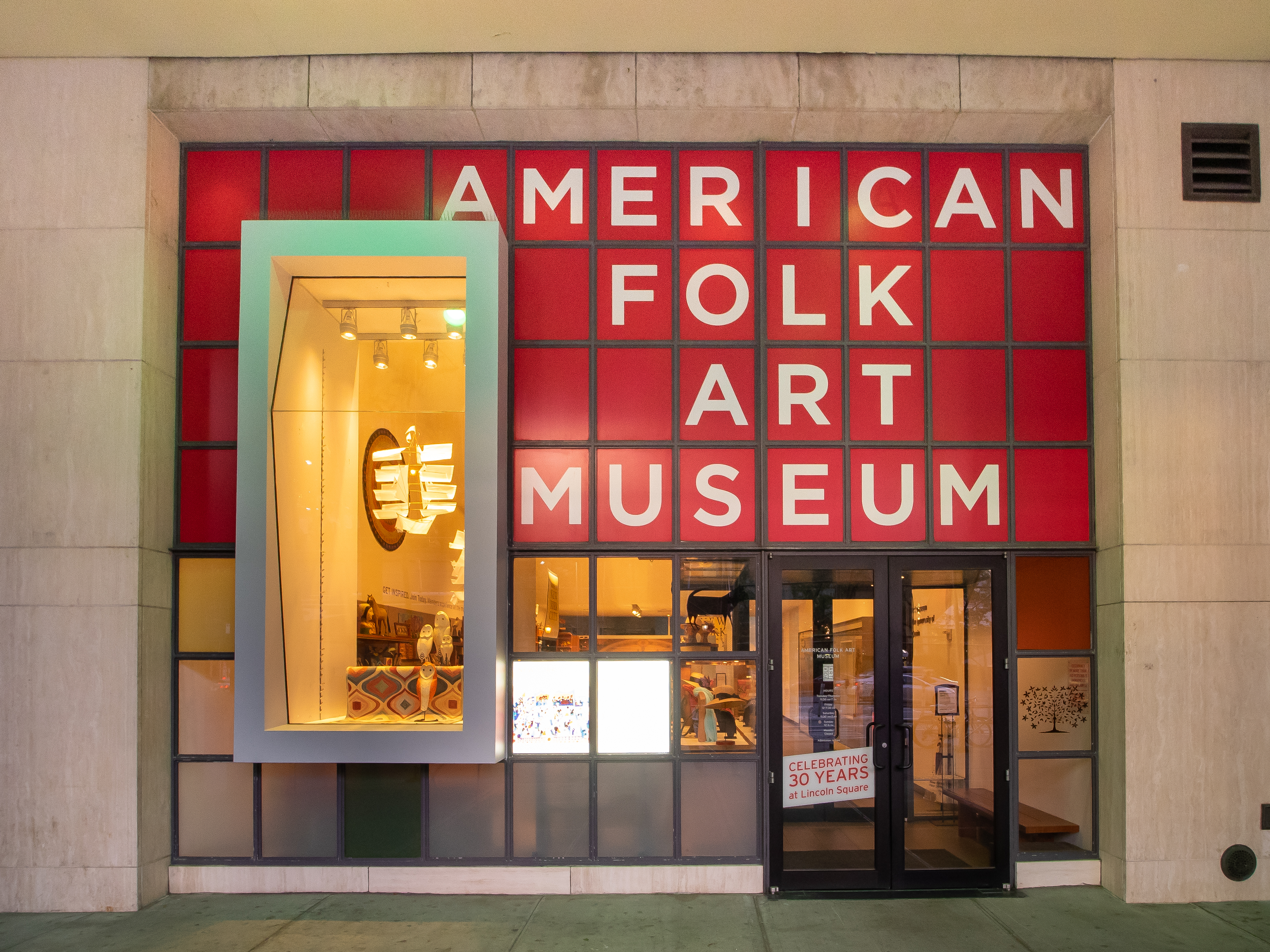
- American Folk Art Museum
- Former name: Museum of Early American Folk Arts
- Established: June 23, 1961
- Location: 2 Lincoln Square; Manhattan, New York, United States
- Coordinates: 40.7732°N 73.9815°W
- Director: Jason T. Busch
- Public transit access: Subway: to 66th Street–Lincoln Center; Buses: M5, M7, M11, M20, M66, M104
- Website: www.folkartmuseum.org

The American Folk Art Museum is an art museum on the Upper West Side of Manhattan in New York City, at 2 Lincoln Square, Columbus Avenue at 66th Street. It is focused on to the display and appreciation of folk art and works by contemporary self-taught artists. The title "American" refers to the location, rather than the nationality of the artists, and past exhibits have included folk arts of Latin America, England, Norway, among other countries and continents.

Its collection holds approximately 7,500 objects from the 18th century to the present. These works are traditional folk art, or otherwise examples of modern or contemporary Art Brut. It hosts ongoing exhibitions, educational programming, and outreach. Since 2018, the Museum has been led by Jason T. Busch, Becky and Bob Alexander Director & CEO. Admission to the museum is free.

== History ==
The museum was founded by Trustees Joseph B. Martinson and Adele Earnest. When it first received provisional charter in 1961, the American Folk Art Museum lacked a permanent collection and a building. Its first exhibition was in a rented space on 49 West 53rd Street in 1961. The museum's collection was launched in 1962 with the gift of a gate in the form of an American flag, celebrating the nation's centennial.

In 1966, after the museum received a permanent charter, Herbert W. Hemphill Jr. expanded its collection to include works "beyond traditional, utilitarian, and communal expressions.” In 1979, the museum's Board of Trustees purchased two townhouses on West 53rd Street, adjacent to Museum's rented quarters at 49 West 53rd Street.

In 1984, while waiting to develop the West 53rd properties, the museum continued to organize exhibitions and educational programs from a former carriage house at 125 West 55th Street. Five years later, a new branch of the museum, the Eva and Morris Feld Gallery, opened at 2 Lincoln Square, New York, opposite Lincoln Center for the Performing Arts.

In the 1990s the museum began to present African American and Latino artworks in their exhibitions and permanent collections. Director Gerard C. Wertkin announced American folk art's common heritage as “promoting an appreciation of diversity in a way that does not foster ethnic chauvinism or racial division.”

The museum further adapted this policy with the 1998 formation of the Contemporary Center, a division of the museum devoted to the work of 20th and 21st century self-taught artists, as well as non-American artworks in the tradition of European art brut. In 2001, the museum opened the Henry Darger Study Center to house 24 of the self-taught artist's works, as well as a collection of his books, tracings, drawings, and source materials.

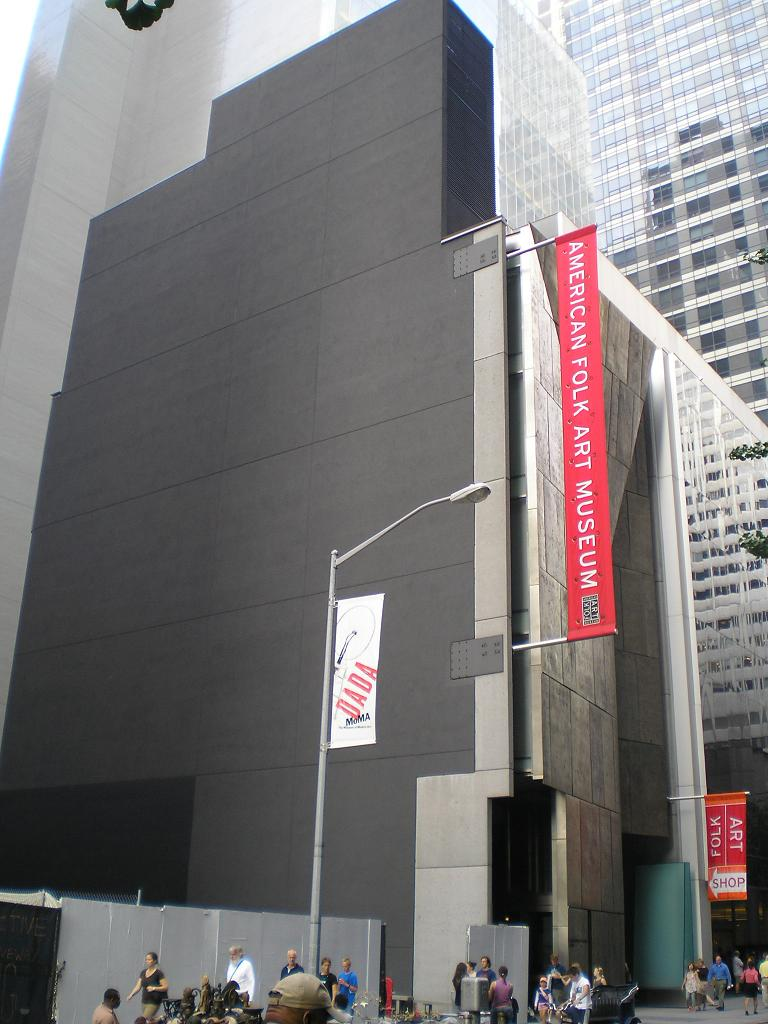
The museum's former building, demolished in 2014.

In 2001 the museum began redeveloping their building on 45–47 West 53rd Street. Designed by Tod Williams and Billie Tsien, it was an eight-level building on the forty-foot-wide, one hundred-foot-long site. From 2001 to 2011, the midtown space served as the museum's main branch. In 2011 the museum sold the property to the Museum of Modern Art. In 2013, the MoMA announced that it was going to demolish the building in connection with its expansion. The building was demolished in 2014, though the unique metal façade was preserved in storage by MoMA.

Following the sale, the American Folk Art Museum used its facility at 2 Lincoln Square as its main exhibition and shop space. In 2014, the museum's archives, library, and administrative staff moved to Long Island City, Queens. In September 2017, the museum opened the Self-Taught Genius Gallery at its facility in Long Island City. The American Folk Art Museum temporarily closed in May 2025 for a renovation. It reopened that September.

=== Leadership ===
From 2012 to 2018, the museum's Executive Director was Anne-Imelda Radice. In 2018, Radice was succeeded by Jason T. Busch, who joined the museum as Executive Director in September, and was later named the Becky and Bob Alexander Director & CEO in 2022. Stacy C. Hollander was the museum's chief curator and director of exhibitions from 1992 until stepping down in 2019. Since joining the museum in 2013, Dr. Valérie Rousseau has served as the curator of self-taught art and art brut. Emilie Gevalt joined the museum as curator of folk art in 2019, and in 2025 Gevalt was named Deputy Director and Chief Curatorial and Program Officer.

== Collection ==
The museum's 7,000 plus collection has been formed almost entirely through gifts. This painting collection ranges from early portraits by Sheldon Peck, Ammi Phillips, Asa Ames, paintings by Sam Doyle, Samuel Addison Shute and Ruth Whittier Shute. Other items include quilts, schoolgirl needlework, furniture, and weathervanes by such artists asThornton Dial, Morris Hirshfield, Martín Ramírez, Judith Scott, Mary T. Smith and Bill Traylor.

In recent years acquisitions have included a version of Edward Hicks's (1780–1849) famed The Peaceable Kingdom. Other acquisitions include portraits Increase Child Bosworth and Abigail Munro Bosworth by Sheldon Peck (1797–1868), Pickman's Mephitic Models by Paul Laffoley (1935–2016), and Plantation Life by Clementine Hunter (1886/87–1988). Street artist KAWS donated a rare sculpture by self-taught artist William Edmondson to the museum in 2021.

Other recent acquisitions include works from the Audrey B. Heckler collection, including art by Aloïse Corbaz, William Edmondson, Madge Gill, Morris Hirshfield, Martín Ramírez, and Adolf Wölfli. The museum announced in April 2025 that it received a major gift of five works by Morris Hirshfield from the Estate of Maria and Conrad Janis, (son of Sidney Janis). This gift is one of the most significant groups of Hirshfield paintings donated to an institution in recent years.

Additionally, the museum has a large collection of archives, artist files, films, recordings, photographs, original research, historical records, and other assorted ephemera. Most notably, the museum holds the largest collection of archival materials from self-taught artist Henry Darger.

=== Selected collection highlights ===
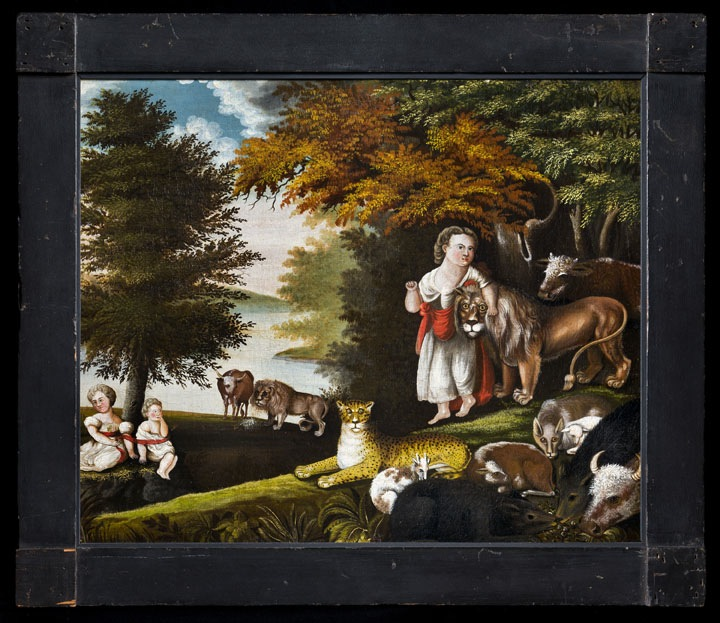
Edward Hicks, Peaceable Kingdom, 1829–1831

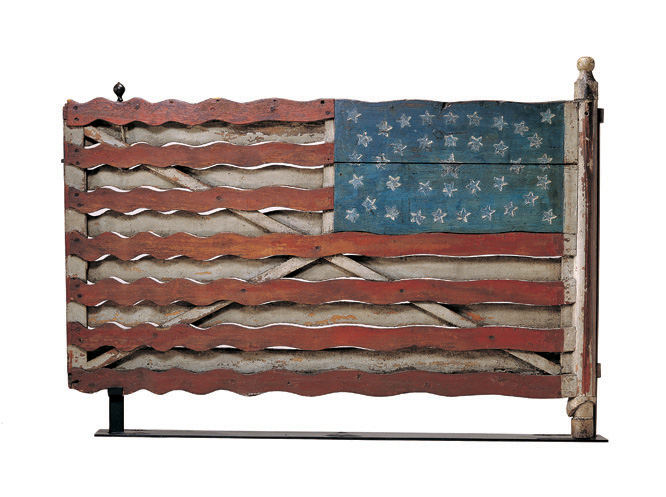
Artist unidentified, Flag Gate, 1876

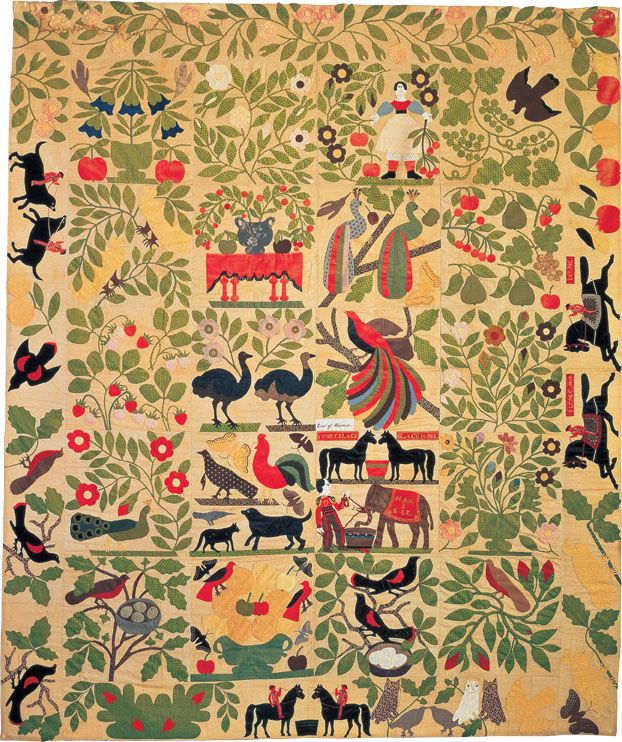
Artist unidentified, Bird of Paradise Quilt Top, 1858–1863

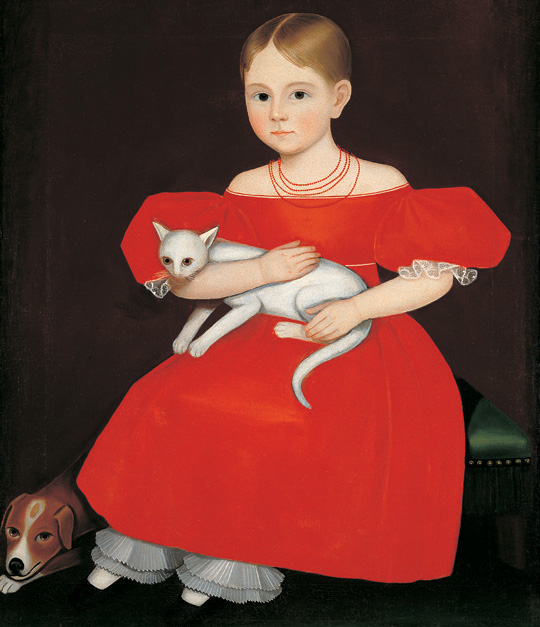
Ammi Phillips, Girl in Red Dress with Cat and Dog, 1830-1835

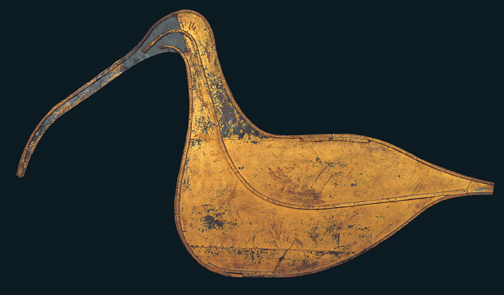
Artist unidentified, Hudsonian Curlew Weathervane, 1874

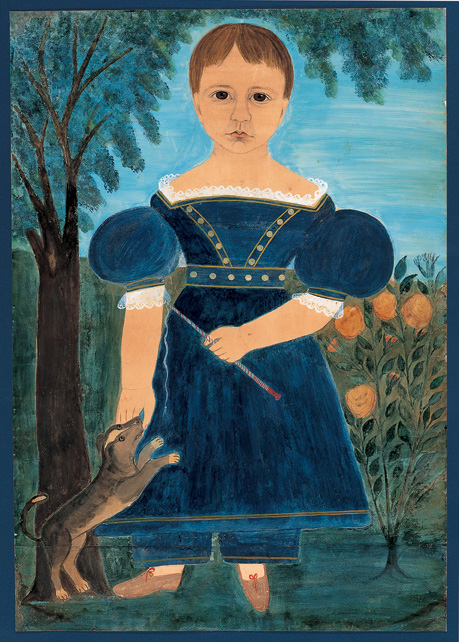
Samuel Addison Shute and Ruth Whittier Shute, Master Burnham, 1831-1832

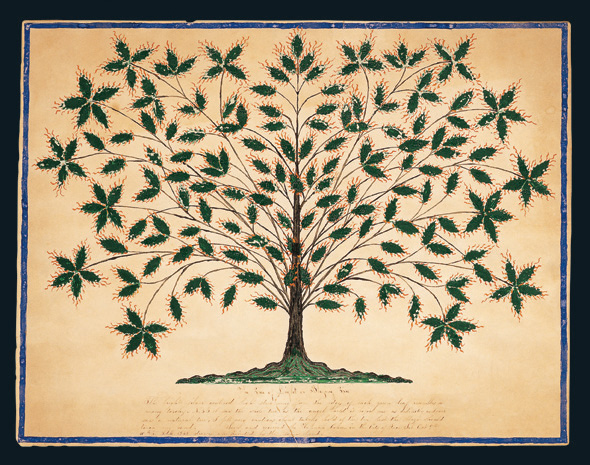
Hannah Cohoon, Gift Drawing: The Tree of Light or Blazing Tree, 1845

== Exhibitions ==
Each year, the museum mounts a number of exhibitions. The museum's exhibits frequently examine the works of a specific artist or the significance of a particular medium, such as quilts or tinsel paintings. By raising traditional folk artists and self-taught artists from the periphery of the mainstream art world, the museum hopes "to prove the worth of instinctive, self-taught artistry."

Through its exhibits, the museum continues to develop the understanding of folk and self-taught artists. Past exhibits have showcased the works of “undersung” masters, such as Thomas Chambers and Asa Ames. Additionally, the museum has hosted solo exhibitions dedicated to the work of self-taught greats: Martín Ramírez, Eugene Von Bruenchenhein, Willem van Genk, Ronald Lockett, John Dunkley, Paa Joe, and Bill Traylor.

Past exhibits have also positioned traditional folk art in conversation with more contemporary art. In the museum's 2008 exhibit, The Seduction of Light: Ammi Phillips/ Mark Rothko Compositions in Pink, Green, and Red explored the visual connections between Rothko's famed color blocks and Phillip's heightened color palette. In 2013, the museum invited thirteen fashion designers to create an original work, inspired by a piece in their collection. The resulting exhibit “Folk Cuture: Fashion and Folk Art” ran from January 21 – April 23, 2014.

In 2014, the museum launched the exhibition, Self-Taught Genius: Treasures from the American Folk Art Museum. Featuring more than 100 works of art, "Self-Taught Genius" offered "an intellectually provocative effort to rethink the nature of artistic creativity" from the eighteenth century to the present. Following its New York premiere, the exhibition travelled to six cities, as part of a national tour funded by the Henry Luce Foundation's 75th anniversary initiative.

Recent major exhibitions include Morris Hirshfield Rediscovered, which aimed to reintroduce the singular self-taught artist of the 1930s and 1940s to contemporary audiences. The New York Times named the exhibition a critic's pick.

In 2023, the museum presented Unnamed Figures: Black Presence and Absence in the Early American North, which featured 125 works including paintings, needlework, and photographs, that focused on figures who appear in—or are omitted from—early American images. The exhibition was designed to challenge conventional narratives which minimized early Black histories in the North, revealing the complexities and contradictions of the region’s history between the late 1600s and early 1800s. The exhibition was heralded by The New York Times as 'a vitally important, deeply moving show.'

== Publications ==
In December 2013, the American Folk Art Museum launched a fully accessible digital archive of 117 issues of its in-house magazine, Folk Art, formerly known as The Clarion. It served as a forum for original research and new scholarship in the field of American folk art. Topics ranged from traditional arts, such as portraiture, schoolgirl arts, painted furniture, and pottery, to discourses on under-recognized artists.

== Honors ==
In 2007, it was among over 530 New York City arts and social service institutions to receive part of a $20 million grant from the Carnegie Corporation, which was made possible through a donation by New York City mayor Michael Bloomberg.

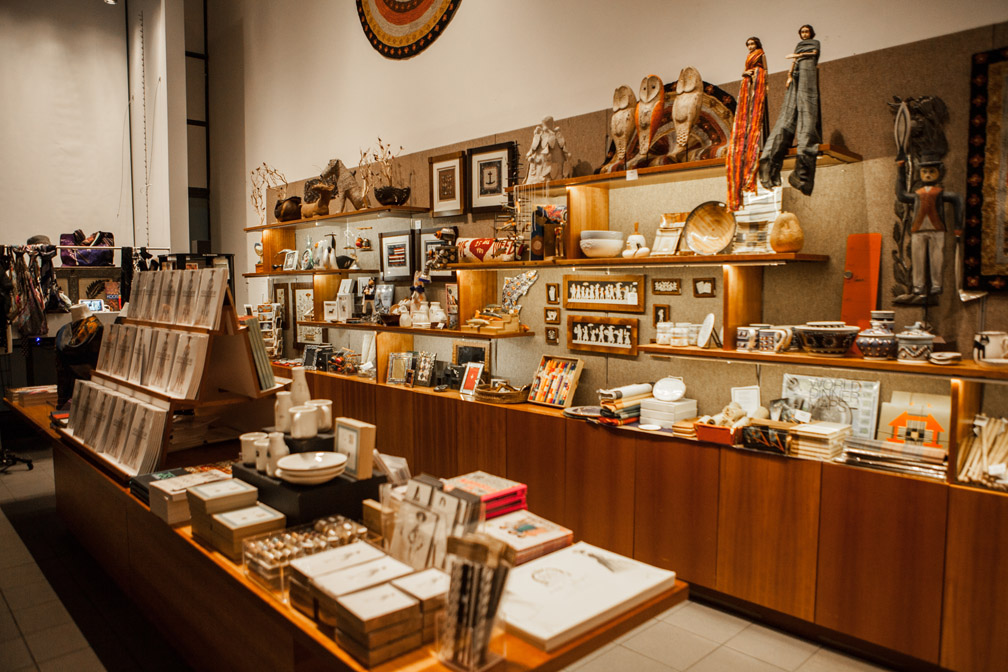
Museum gift shop

In March 2025, readers of Newsweek magazine voted the American Folk Art Museum #1 in the publication's Best Art Museum 2025 readers' choice contest.

== See also ==
- List of museums and cultural institutions in New York City
