= Tobias and the Angel (Verrocchio) =

Painting by the workshop of Andrea del Verocchio

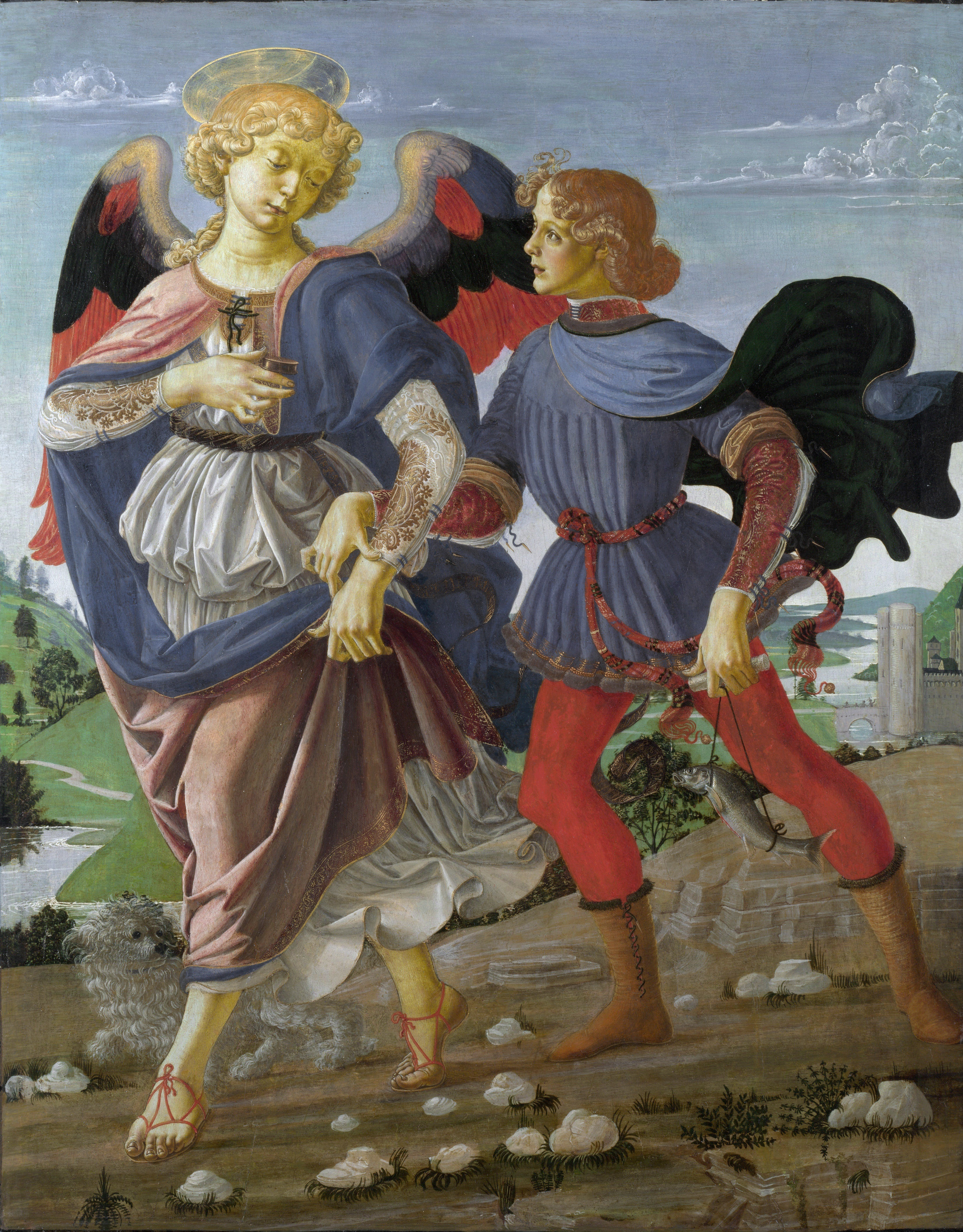
- Artist: Andrea del Verrocchio
- Year: 1470–1480
- Type: Egg tempera on poplar
- Dimensions: 83.6 cm × 66 cm (32.9 in × 26 in)
- Location: National Gallery, London

Tobias and the Angel is a painting in egg tempera on poplar panel, finished around 1470–1475, measuring 83.6 × 66 cm. It is painting by the Italian Renaissance painter Andrea del Verrocchio. It is now in the National Gallery, London. This painting is similar to an earlier painting depicting Tobias and the Angel, by Piero and Antonio del Pollaiuolo. Tobias and the Angel was a popular subject in Florence at the time.

Various art historians have suggested that the young Leonardo da Vinci, who was a member of Verrocchio's studio, may have painted some part of this work, most likely the fish, or the dog, supported by David Alan Brown, of the National Gallery, Washington. If so, this would be perhaps the first extant example of a painting with input by Leonardo.

Possibly attributed to the young Leonardo da Vinci:

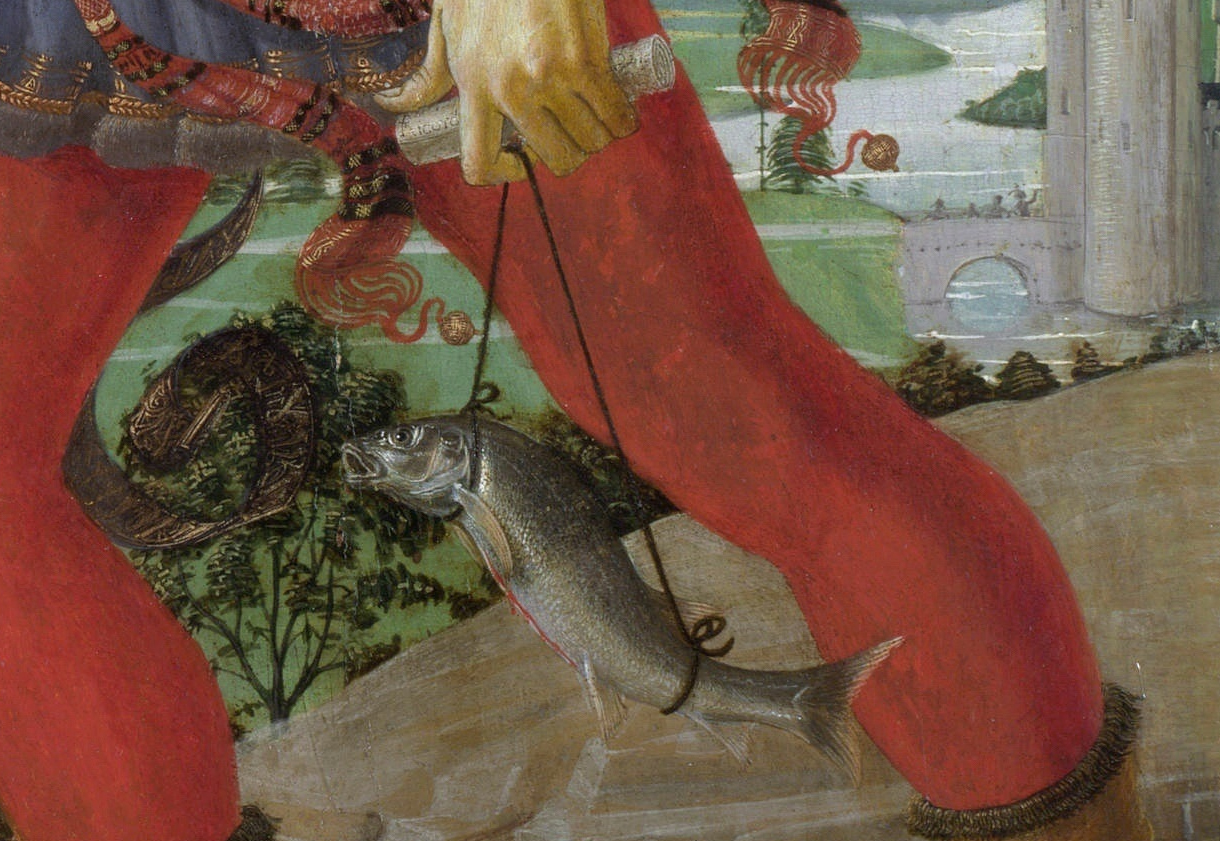
The fish

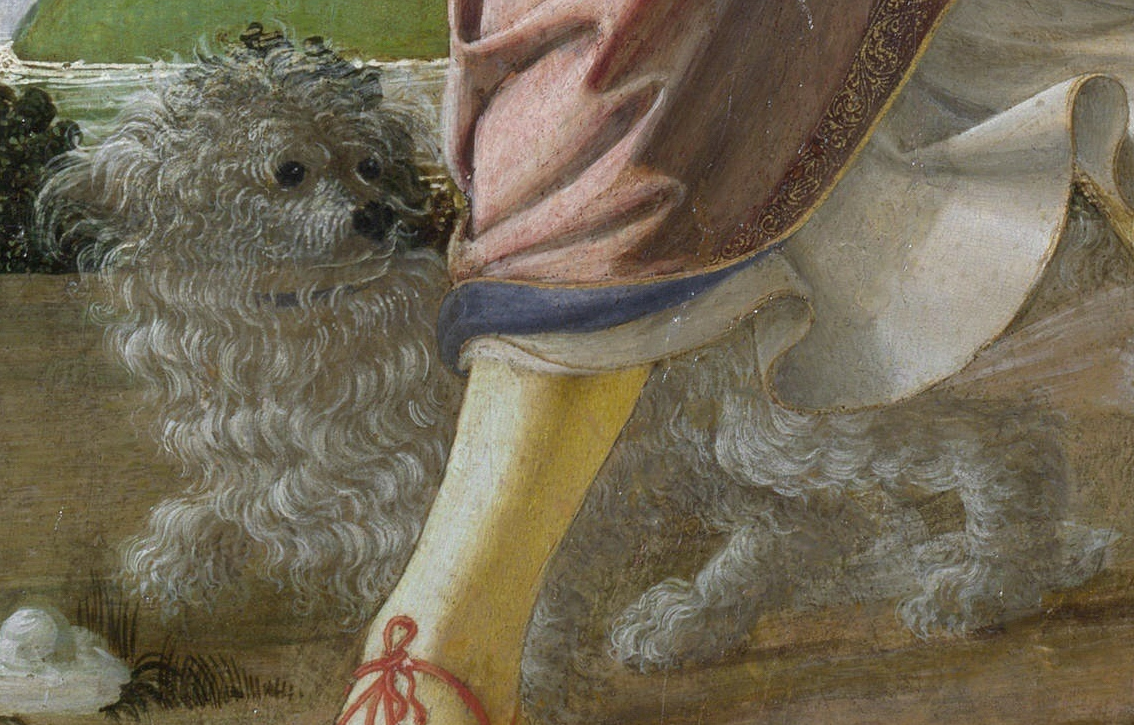
The dog
