= Madonna with the Fish =

Painting by Raphael

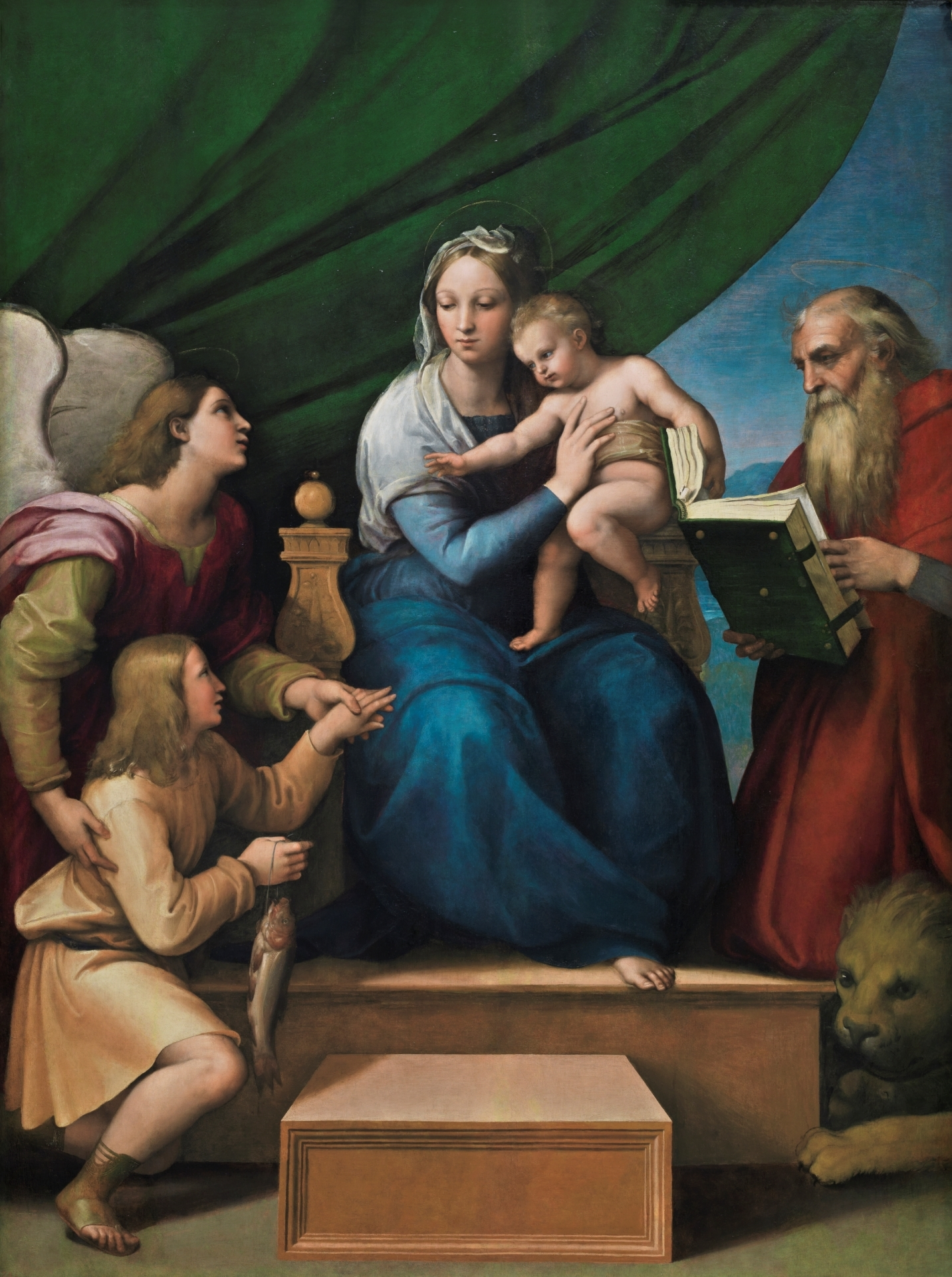
- Artist: Raphael
- Year: 1513–1514
- Type: oil on panel, transferred to canvas
- Dimensions: 113 cm × 88 cm (44 in × 35 in)
- Location: Museo del Prado, Madrid

Madonna of the Fish, known also as Madonna with the Fish is a painting by the High Renaissance master Raphael, dated to 1513-14. It is now in the Museo del Prado, Madrid. Mary sits enthroned with Jesus on her knee. On one side is St. Jerome, dressed as a cardinal, kneeling by his attribute, a lion; he is holding his Vulgate translation of the Bible. On the other side the archangel Raphael is presenting at the foot of the throne the young Tobias, whom he had accompanied to the River Tigris, and who bears the miraculous fish whose heart, liver and gall were to restore his father's sight, and drive the demons from his bride.

Tobias with his fish was an early type of baptism. Raphael leading Tobias always expresses protection, and especially protection to the young. The picture is believed to have been painted around 1512–1514 to commemorate the introduction of Book of Tobit to the canonical books of the Catholic Church. St. Jerome translated the Book of Tobit into Latin, which explains his presence on the right of Mary.

There are preparatory drawings in the Uffizi in Florence and the National Gallery of Scotland in Edinburgh.

== Provenance ==
It was painted for a chapel at a monastery in Naples, and during Spanish rule over the Kingdom of Naples was bought by the Spanish Viceroy for Philip IV of Spain. From 1645 it was in El Escorial, until the Spanish Royal Collection mostly passed to the Prado.

== See also ==
- List of paintings by Raphael
