= Tobias and the Angel =

Artistic subject from the Book of Tobit

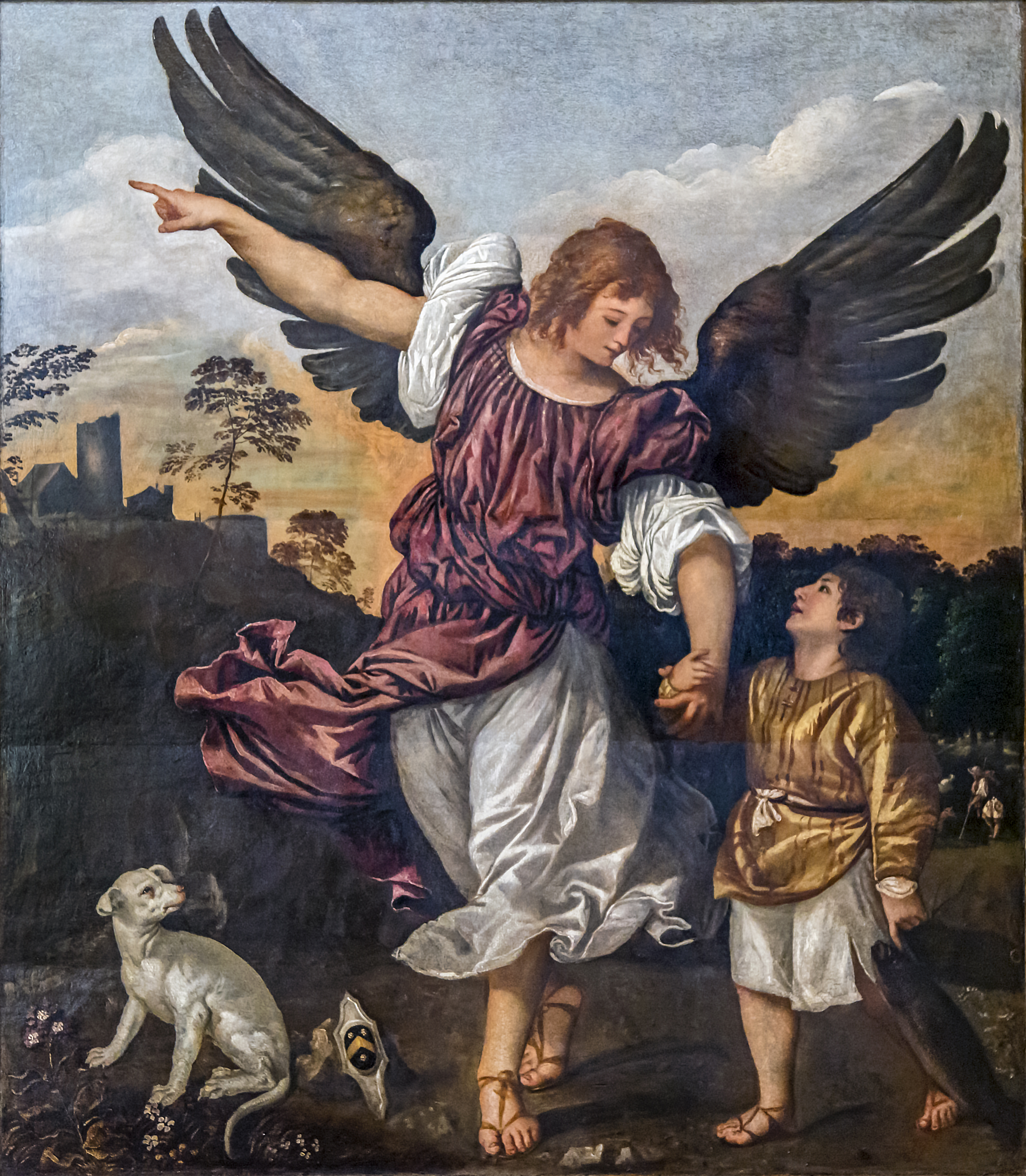
Titian, The Archangel Raphael and Tobias (c. 1512−1514)

Tobias and the Angel is the traditional title of depictions in art of a passage from the Book of Tobit in which Tobias, son of Tobit, travels with the Archangel Raphael without realising he is an angel (5.5–6) and is then instructed by Raphael what to do with a giant fish he catches (6.2–9). The Book of Tobit is accepted by Catholic and Eastern Orthodox Christians as part of the biblical canon, but not by Judaism or most Protestant Christians, the latter including it in the Apocrypha.

Depictions usually show Raphael and a much smaller Tobias walking through a landscape, accompanied by Tobias's dog. Tobias is usually carrying a fish (or two), often tied up with string, or a container for the fish's organs that will later cure his father; more often Raphael carries a small box with these. Raphael usually has large wings, which we must suppose are invisible to Tobias, as in the story he remains unaware his companion is an angel. When the story was written, angels were not imagined to have wings, which were a later convention, taken from the Roman winged Victory.

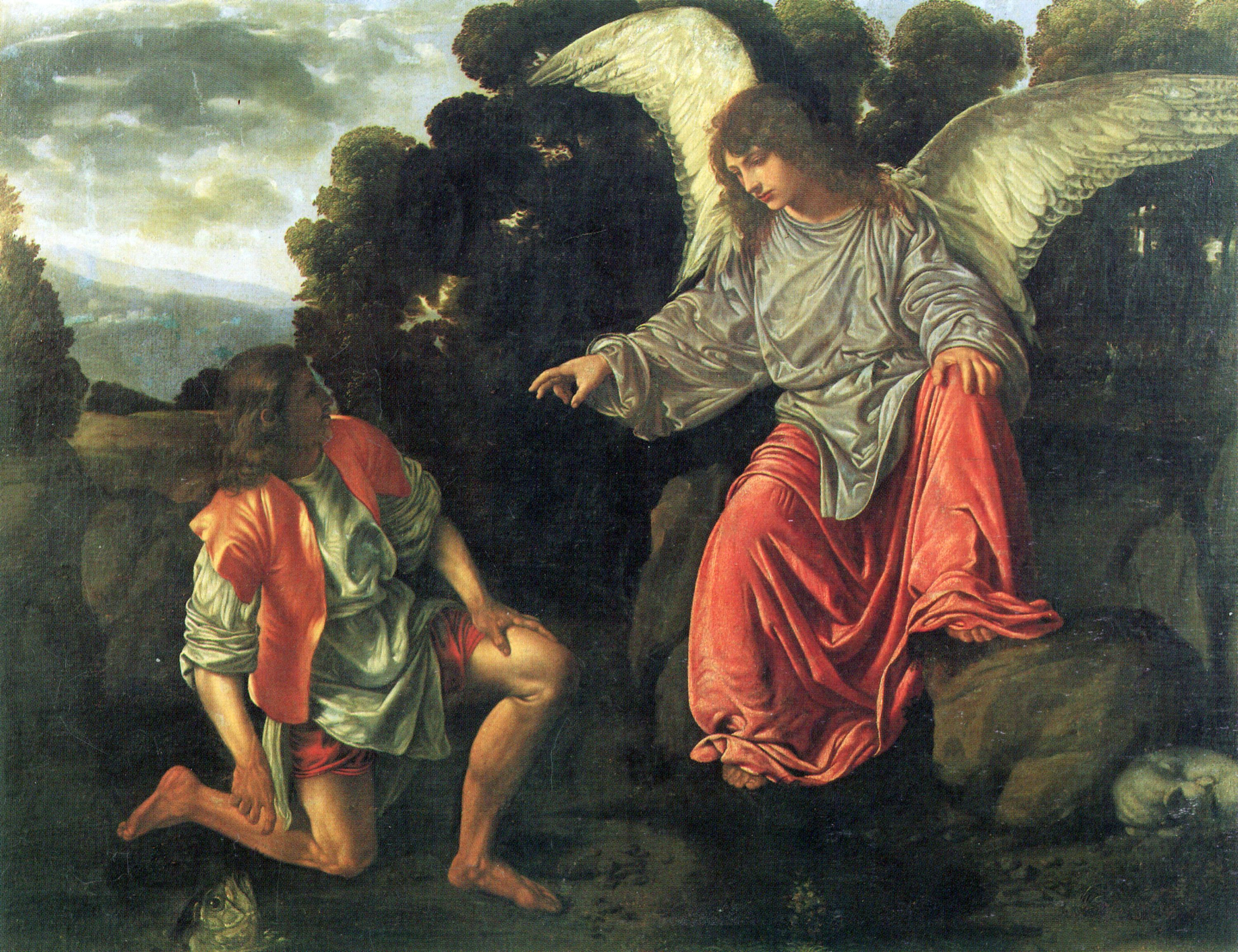
Girolamo Savoldo, 1542, with the large fish in the water

An alternative depiction, somewhat less common until the Baroque period in the 17th century, shows Tobias with the very large fish he catches in the River Tigris. Typically Tobias is on the ground, sometimes in the water, and Raphael stands behind him, encouraging him to catch it. The fish Tobias carries in the travelling depictions are much more normally sized, and like the dog and Raphael's wings, serve as attributes to identify the subject. Where the composition allows it, both scenes may be shown. It is thought that the original story (which survives in Hebrew, Aramaic and Greek versions) probably involved a crocodile rather than a fish.

Dogs are unusual in Christian religious art, but the New Testament subject of the Exorcism of the Syrophoenician woman's daughter and the Old Testament one of Tobias and the Angel are exceptions, as they are mentioned in the texts, and depictions often include them. Although the dog in the Biblical account is presumably given to Tobias by his father to provide security as he travels carrying a significant amount of silver, artists tend to show very small dogs, with a long coat of hair that covers deficiencies in drawing them. Artists become noticeably more competent in this as the Renaissance progresses. Ancient Israelites regarded dogs as unclean, and they are "seldom represented elsewhere in the Bible as man's friend", another element suggesting the origin of the story in neighbouring cultures.

== Context ==
Among the major, named, angels, Raphael's speciality was regarded as protection and healing, his name meaning "God heals". As the concept of a personal guardian angel developed during the late Middle Ages, he was regarded as a chief of this branch of angelic service. In the relief on a corner of the Doge's Palace in Venice (illustrated below) Raphael holds a scroll on which is written: "Efficia fretum quietum" ("Keep the Gulf quiet").

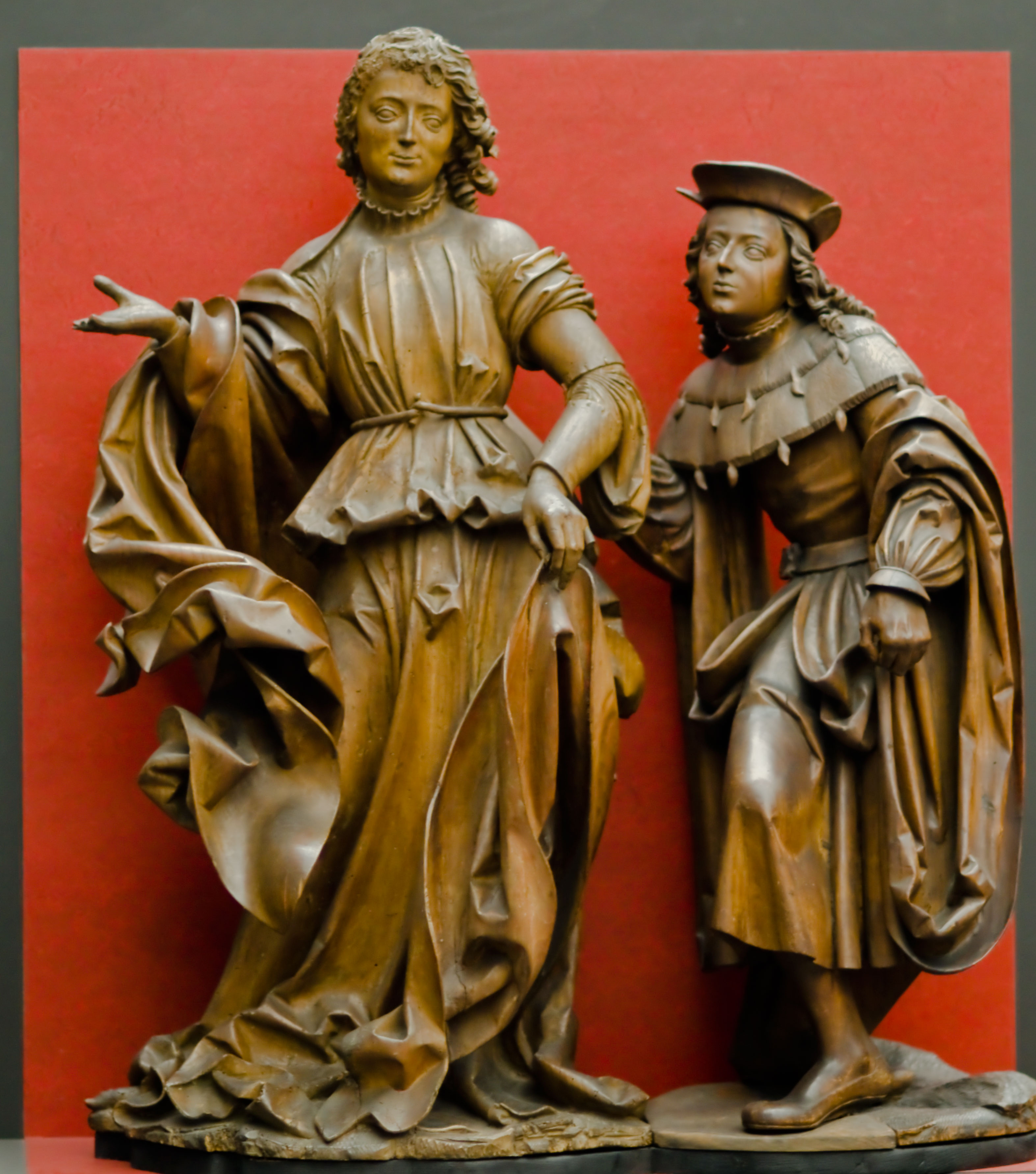
Two limewood sculptures, 1516, by Veit Stoss, now Germanisches Nationalmuseum, Nuremberg]

The subject had an appeal to merchants engaged in long-distance trade, and it has been thought that at least some paintings were votives for the protection of a young family member sent on a long business trip; some figures of Tobias may even be portraits. In a later part of the biblical story Tobias marries, perhaps a matter of days after he catches the fish, but in many depictions, especially Italian Renaissance ones, he looks much too young for this, even allowing for contemporary and ancient ideas of a suitable age for marriage. In depictions after about 1530, especially ones made north of the Alps, Tobias often appears adult.

Tobias and the Angel is the main narrative scene to include Raphael, and its popularity is usually explained by an increase in devotion to him at this time, encouraged by confraternities associated with him, in particular the youth confraternity of Archangel Raphael, which was significant in Florence throughout this period, with (apart from a lay adult and priest) the members all males aged between about 14 and 24.

Raphael (and Raphaela) became popular given names in this period; the painter Raphael, properly known as Raffaello Sanzio, was born in 1483. This increased the demand for images of Raphael as a patron's name-saint; for example the pair of wooden sculptures by Veit Stoss were commissioned by a Florentine merchant in silk and jewellery called Raphaele Torrigiani.

== Art history ==
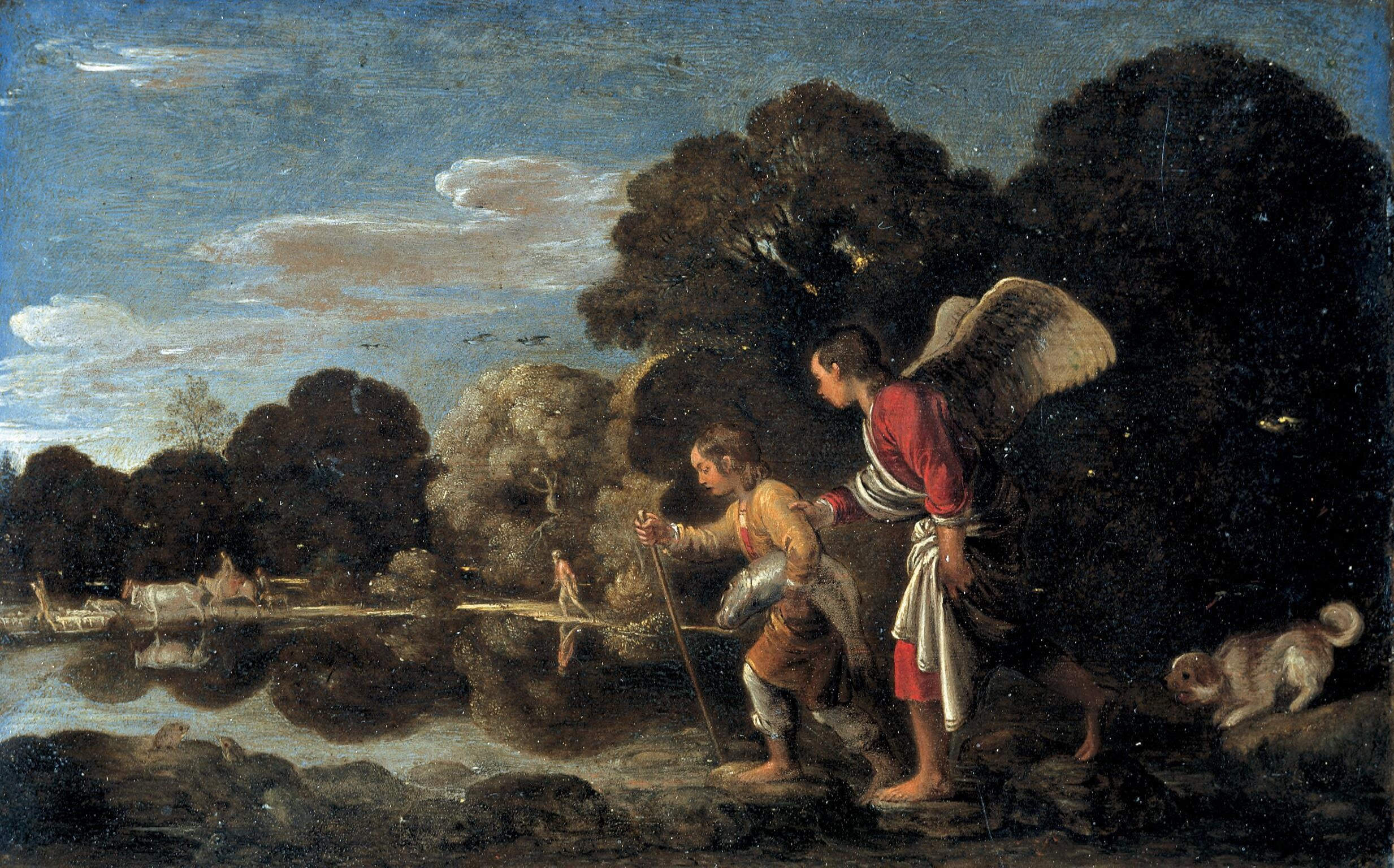
Adam Elsheimer, the "small Tobias", c. 1606, now Frankfurt

The scene was uncommon until about 1450, when it became very popular in northern Italy, especially Florence. This popularity lasted for about a century; small figures of Tobias and Raphael sometimes appear in the landscape backgrounds of more central religious scenes, such as a Virgin and Child by Lorenzo di Credi and an Adoration of the Kings by Filippino Lippi, both in the National Gallery.

Ernst Gombrich noted that Florentine depictions were "concentrated" between 1425 and 1475. These, for which the version by the Pollaiuolo brothers perhaps provided the prototype, usually show a very richly dressed young teenager and a very small white dog. In Vasari's time the Pollaiuolo hung in the very prominent location of the Orsanmichele.

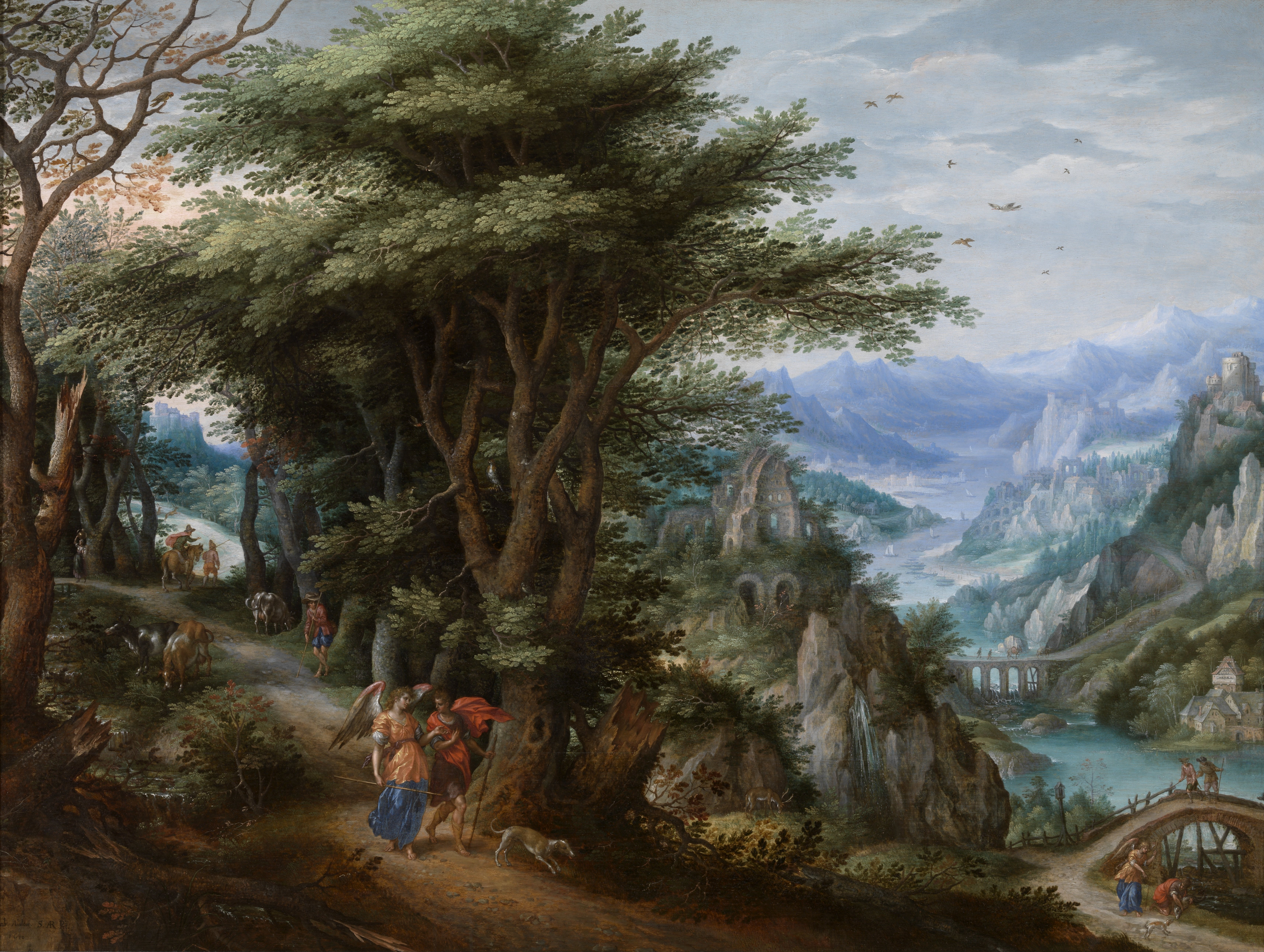
Denis van Alsloot and Hendrik de Clerck, Landscape with Tobias and the Angel, 17th century. The pair appear twice.

In the 17th century, the subject had a second life as a device to turn a Baroque landscape into a more prestigious history painting by adding small figures, dwarfed by their surroundings. This reversed the relative proportions of the Florentine quattrocento depictions, which mostly had large figures at the front of the picture space and the landscape only visible through the gaps they left. Such scenes were also popular as prints. In some expansive Baroque compositions they appear twice, travelling and catching the giant fish; they are shown three times in a world landscape composition painted by a follower of Patinir, now in the Frans Hals Museum.

Transitional to this phase are the three paintings around the start of the century by the German Adam Elsheimer, with his "small Tobias" (now in Frankfurt, 12.4 x 19.2 cm) copied many times, in paintings and prints. The "poetic depiction... and atmospheric rendering of nature represent a new vision of landscape which ... caused a stir in Rome" (where he was living). It has a horizontal format, and the figures are spread across about half the width.

Presumably discovered through European prints, the subject attracted a number of painters of Mughal miniatures, although their images depart considerably from the biblical story as they had probably never read the text, and mis-understood or deliberately changed many points. Tobias may also have wings, and both he and Raphael may have bodies covered with feathers, in "a kaleidoscopic mixture of European, Indian and Persian influences".

=== Narrative paintings ===
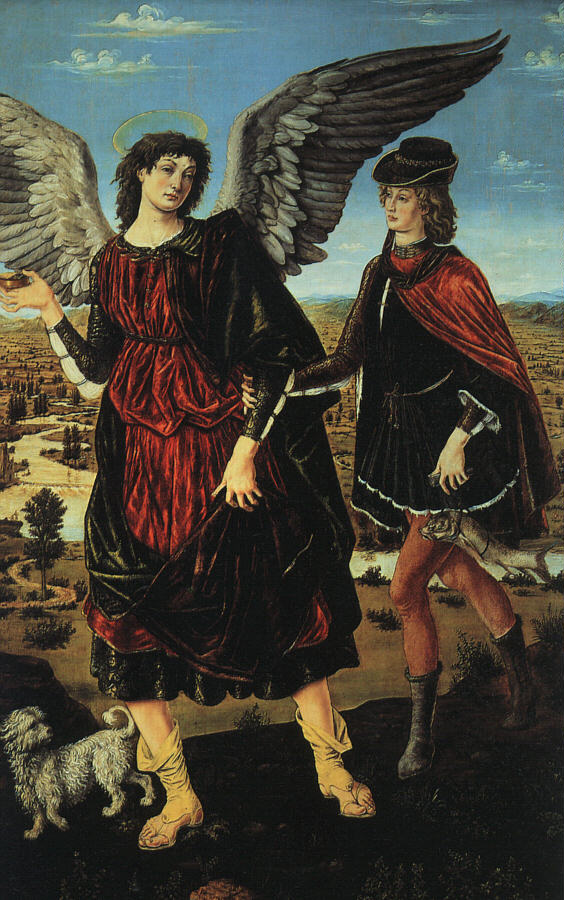
Antonio and Piero del Pollaiuolo, Tobias and the Angel (c. 1465–1470)

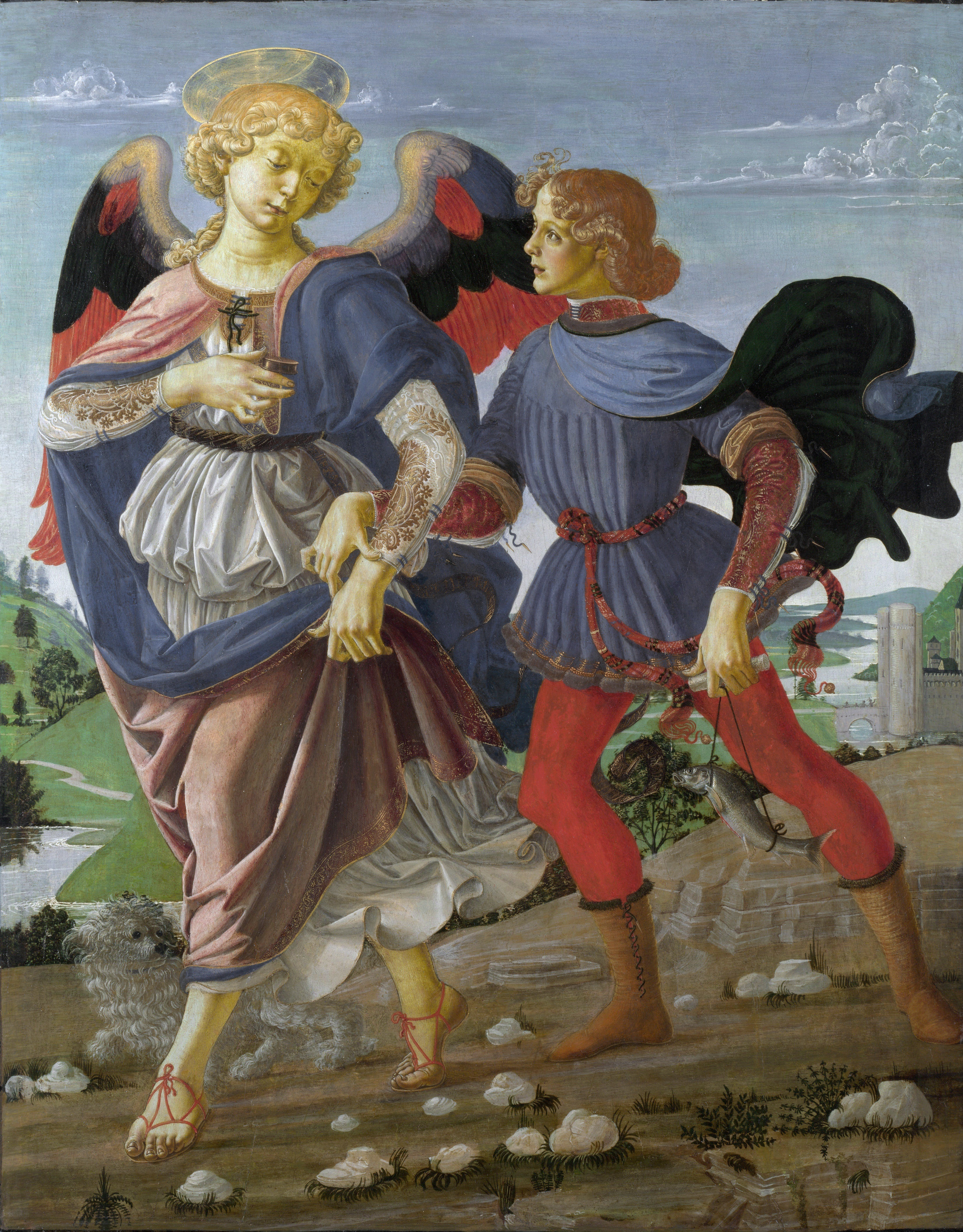
Workshop of Andrea del Verrocchio, Tobias and the Angel (c. 1470–1475)

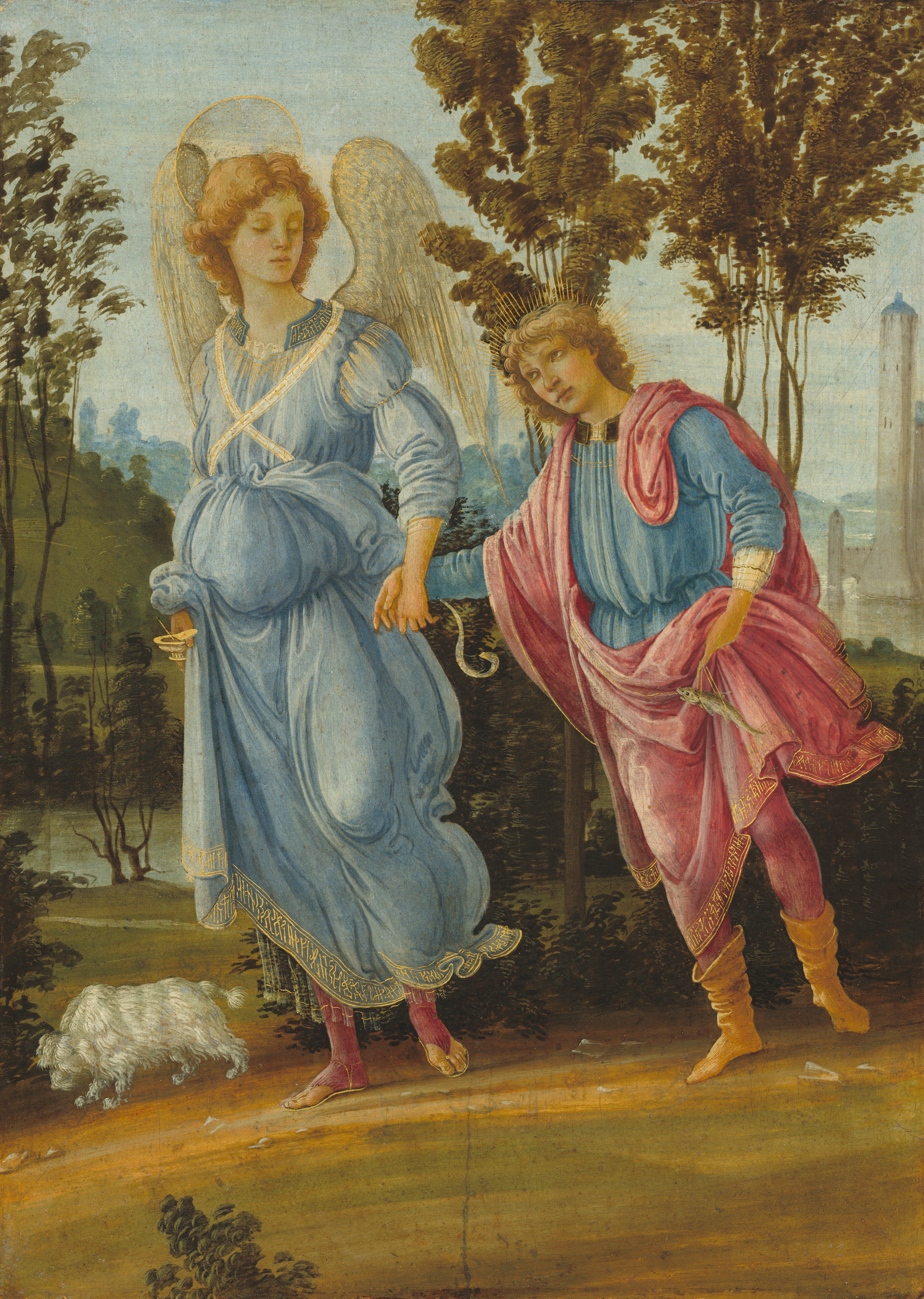
Filippino Lippi, Tobias and the Angel (c. 1475–1480)

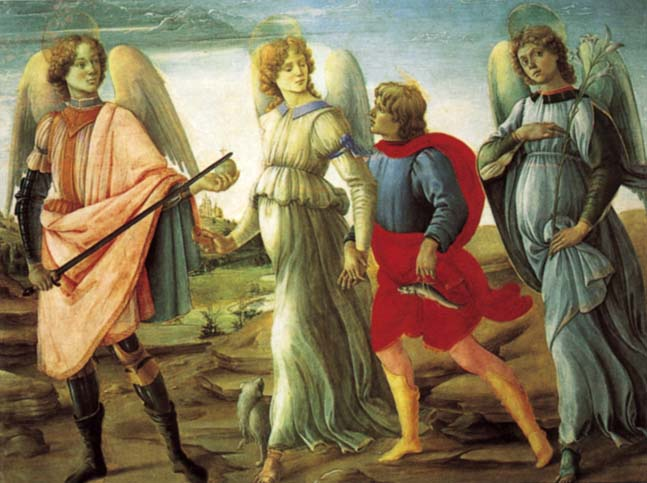
Filippino Lippi, Three Angels and Young Tobias (c. 1485)

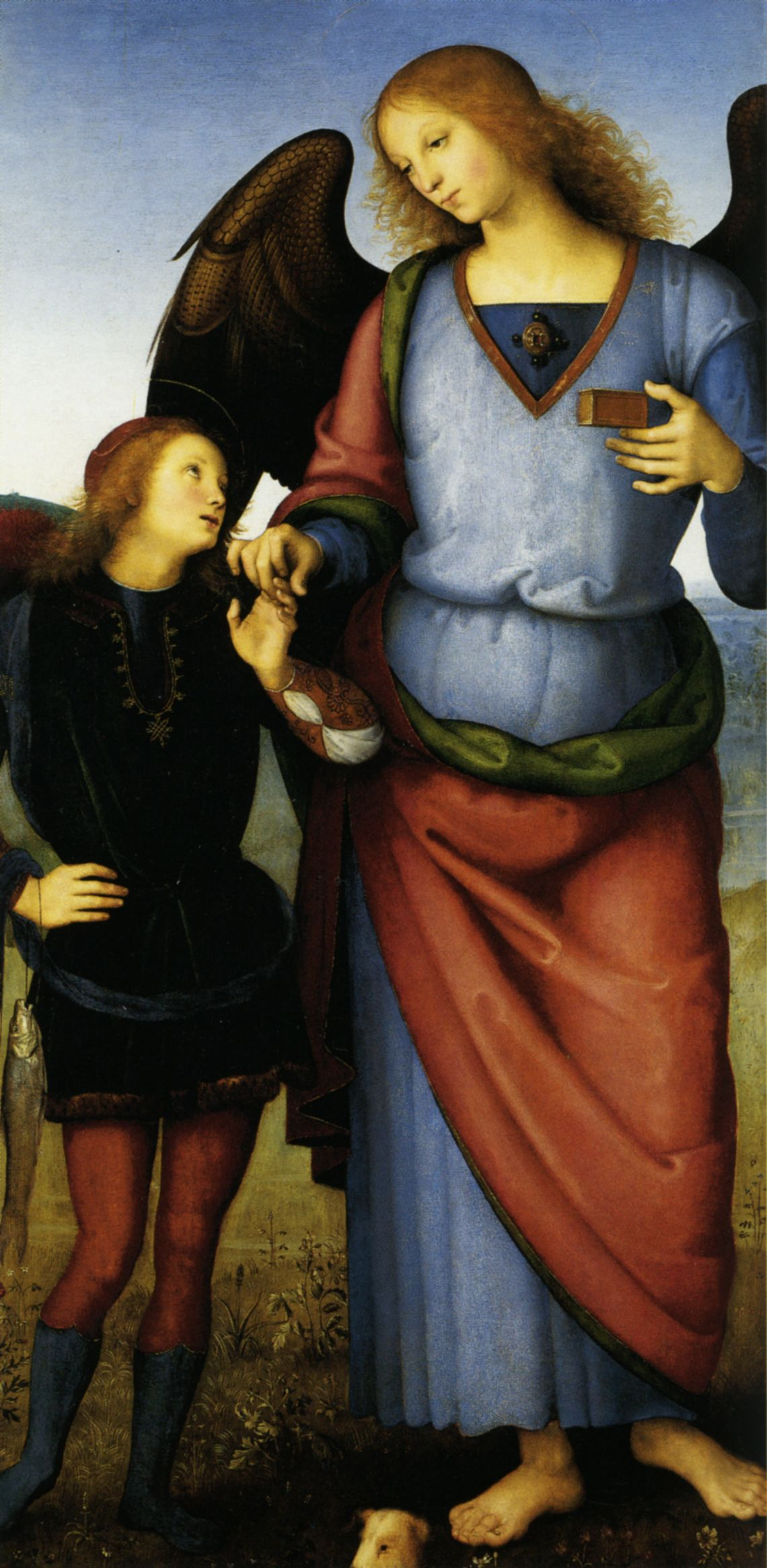
Pietro Perugino, Tobias and the Angel (c. 1496–1500)

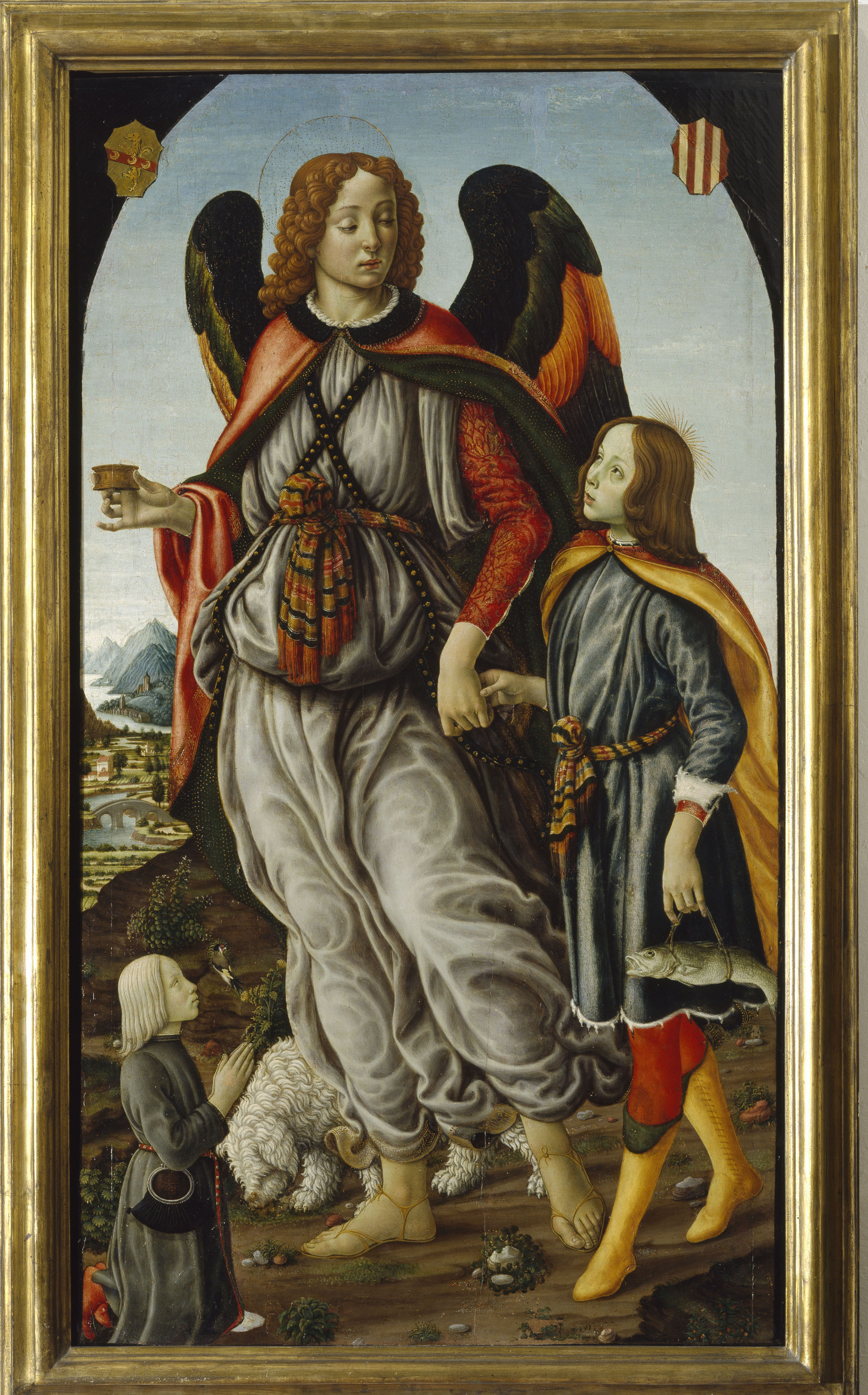
With a boy donor portrait, Francesco Botticini

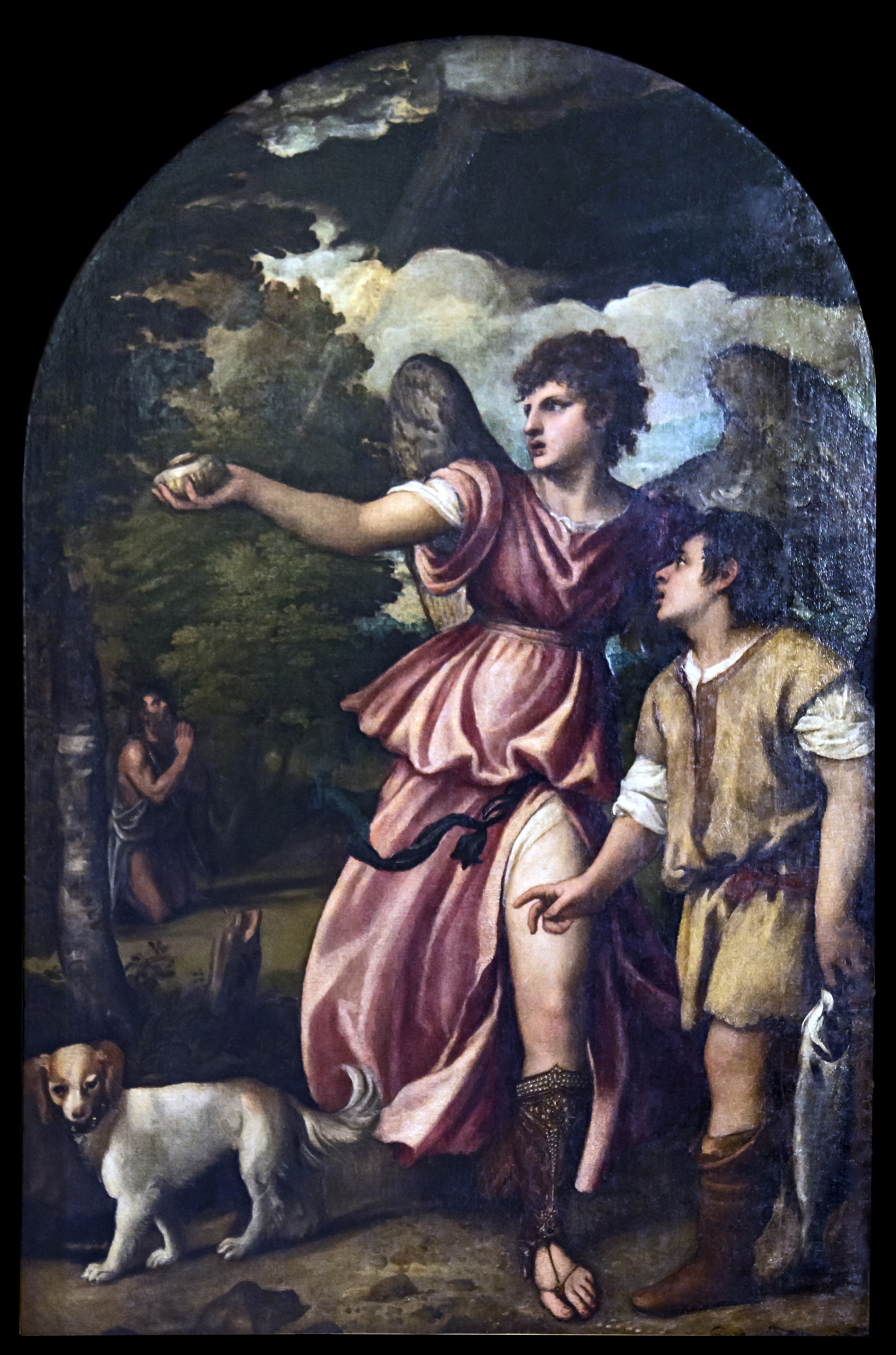
Titian, Tobias and the Angel (c. 1540–1545)

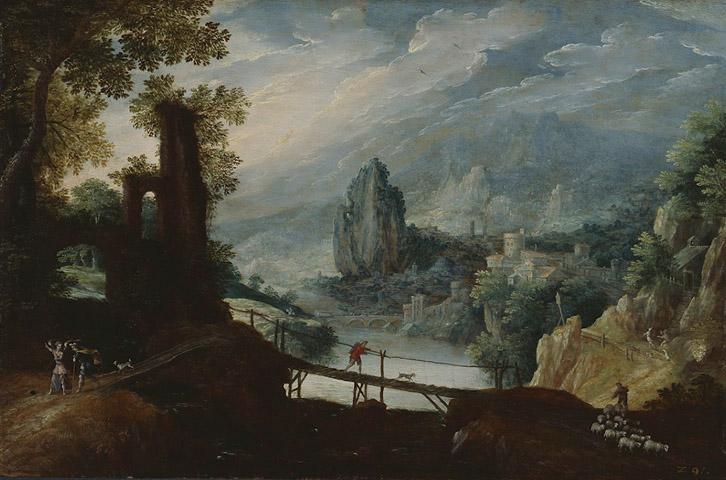
Tobias Verhaecht, Mountain landscape with Tobias and the Angel, c. 1600

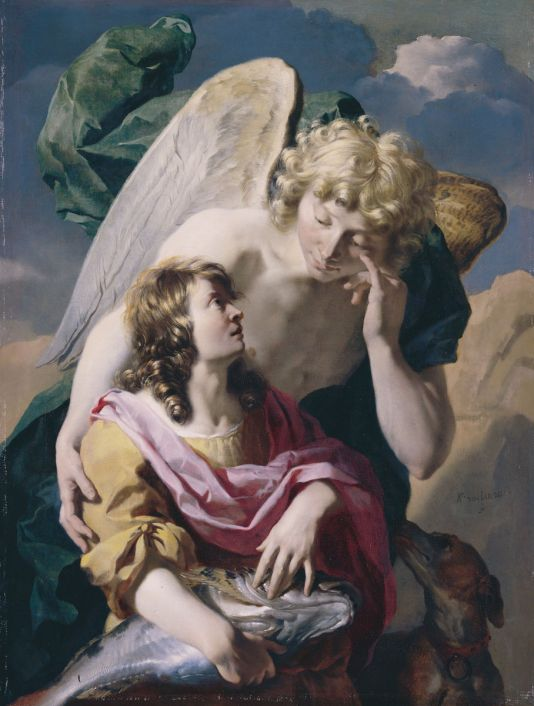
Karel Dujardin, c. 1660

=== Intrusive appearances ===
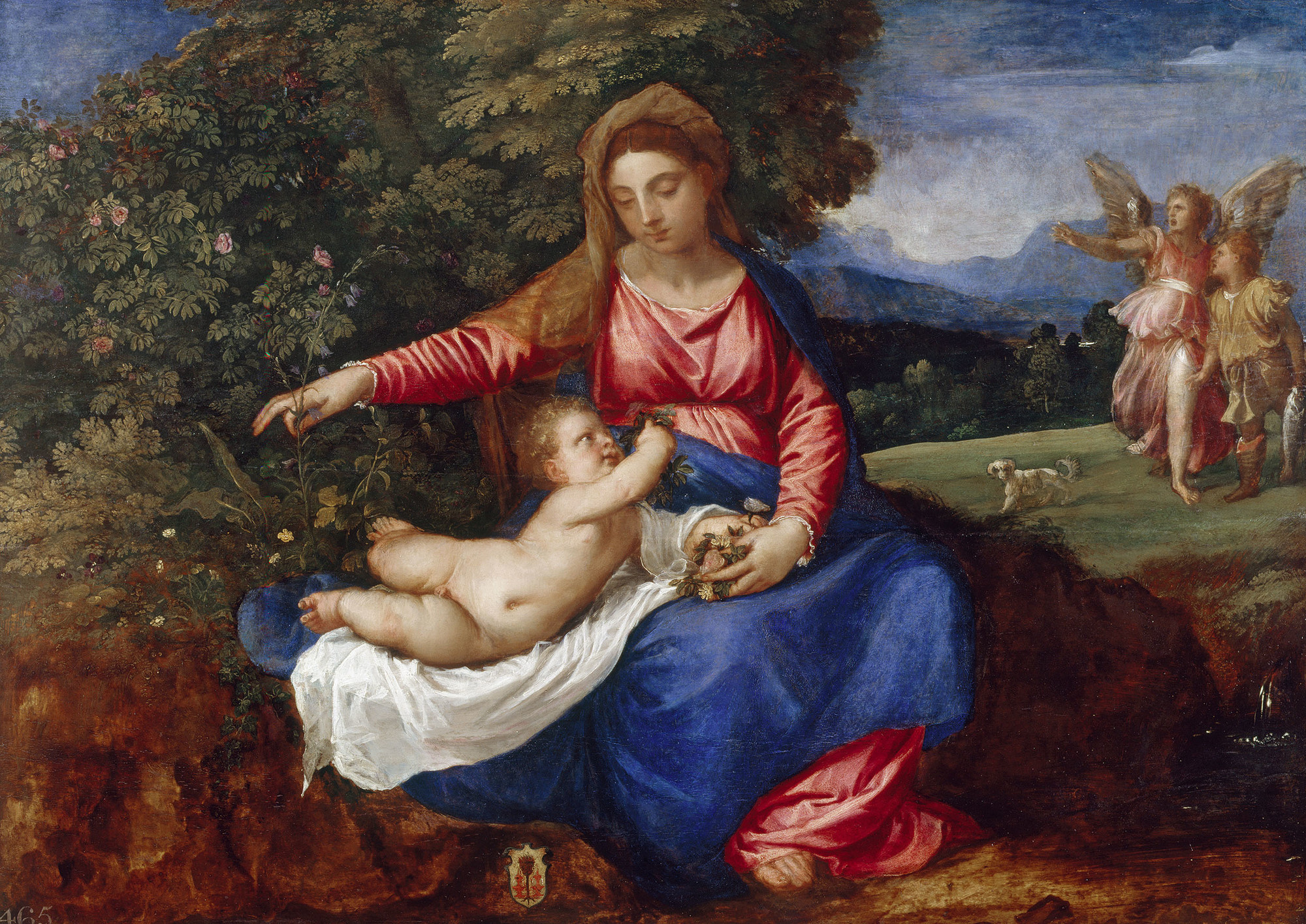
Titian and workshop, Madonna and Child in a Landscape with Tobias and the Angel, c. 1535-40.

The popularity of the subject in the Italian Renaissance is shown by its intrusion into paintings of other religious subjects as a vignette in the background, presumably at the request of the patron. Titian's Madonna and Child in a Landscape with Tobias and the Angel in the British Royal Collection (part of the Dutch Gift to the restored Charles II) is one of "four closely related compositions by Titian and his workshop" of the Virgin and Child with a variety of other figures, of which this is the only one to include Tobias and the Angel, plus dog and fish.

They are in the fairly close background, the two groups taking no notice of each other, a common feature of such images, reflecting the breach of the biblical space-time continuum in showing the different figures together in the same picture space. The Tobias group are "very freely painted and contrasting markedly with the careful painting of the foreground". Their composition, with Raphael pointing, is similar to the Titian of the 1540s in Venice (see above).

In a similar way neither the main figures nor the predella-like Tobias and the Angel within the Pala delle Convertite (Courtauld Gallery) by Botticelli and his workshop seem aware of the other group. In this case we know the Tobias pair were originally in a different position, in a landscape on the right, where their scale matched the main figures in the scheme of perspective. Finely painted, they are probably by Botticelli himself, unlike much of the rest of the painting. The Bavarian Baroque altarpiece known as Mary, Untier of Knots, a favourite of Pope Francis, has a similar very small Tobias and the Angel below the Virgin.

The Shepherd Boy Pointing at Tobias and the Angel by Abraham Bloemaert in the Minneapolis Institute of Art belongs to a specific tradition in Dutch Golden Age painting of combining a main genre painting scene in the foreground with a smaller distant biblical scene.

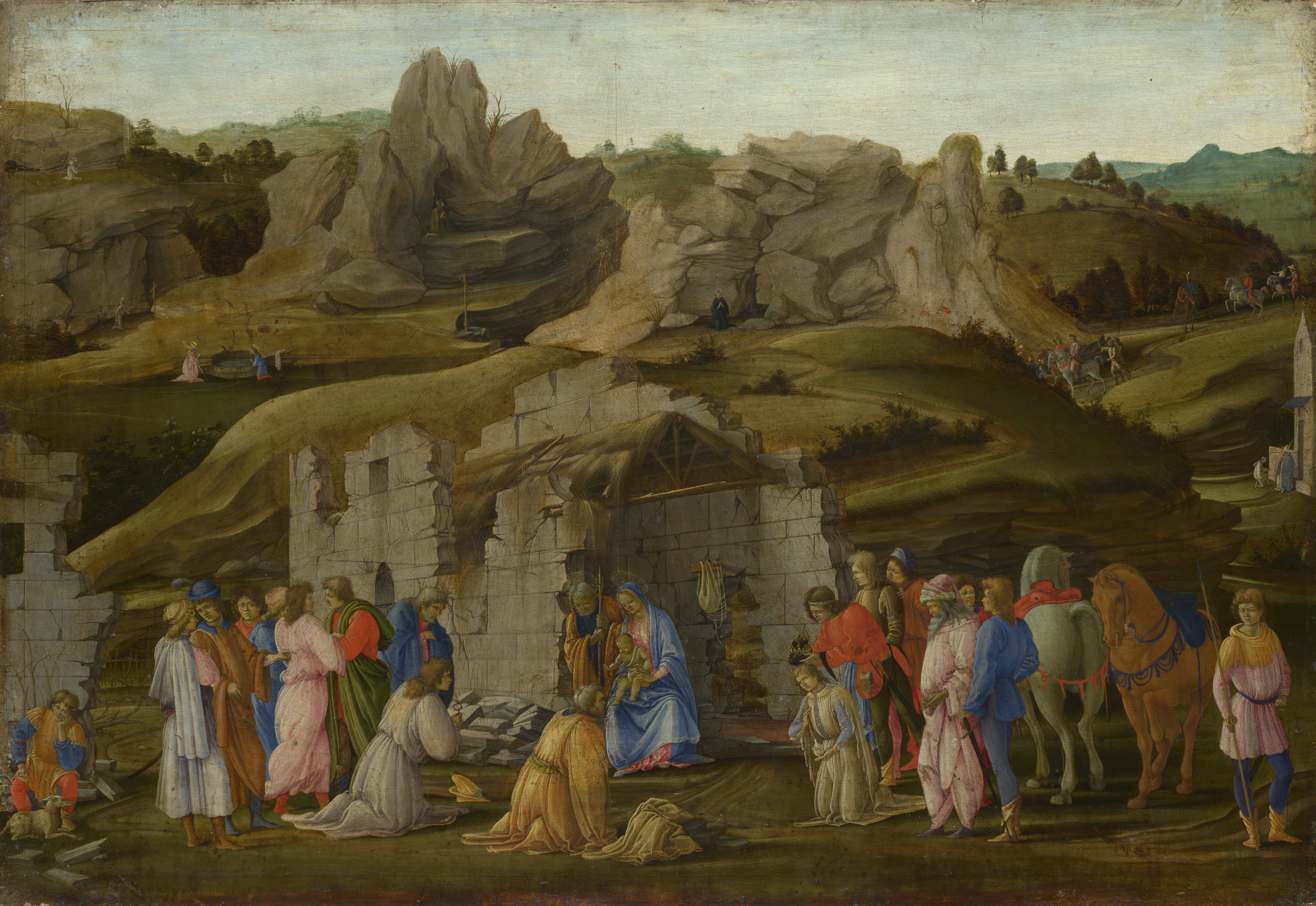
Adoration of the Kings, Filippino Lippi. Tobias and the Angel (left side) are among various small figures of saints dotted around the landscape background.

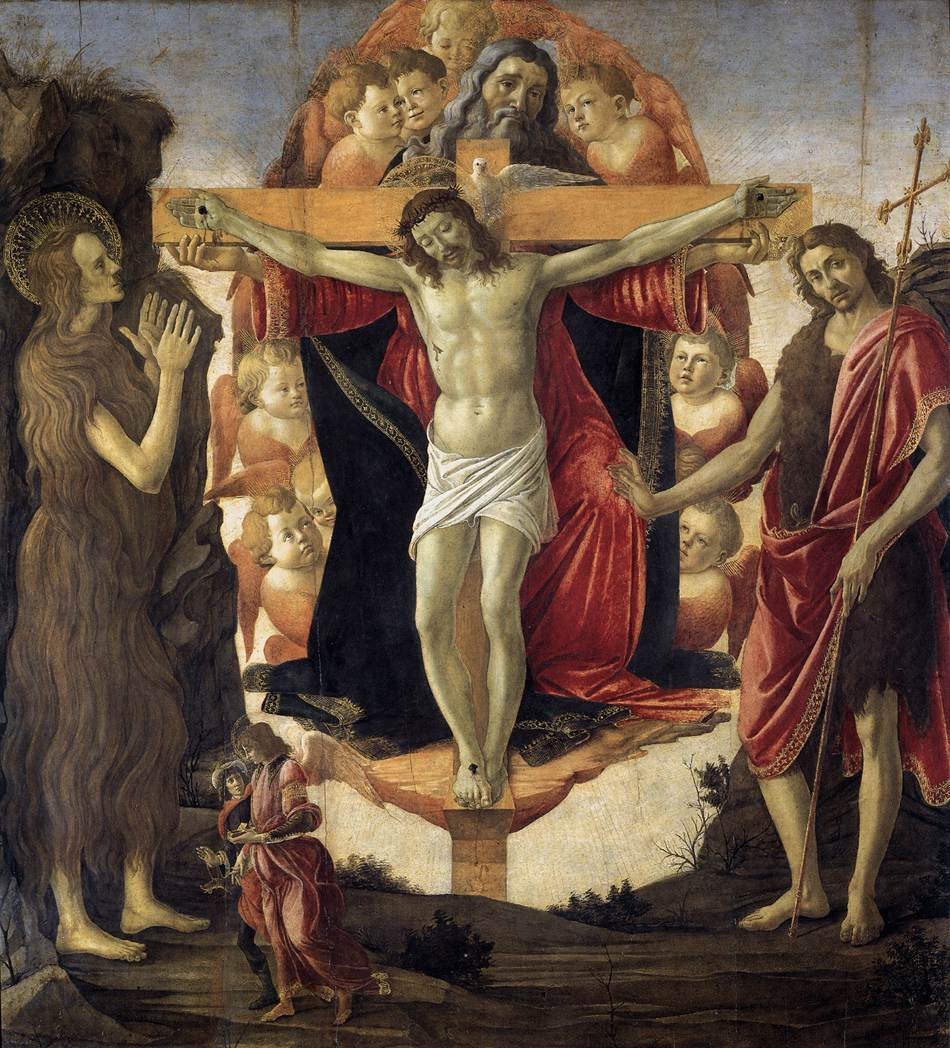
Botticelli and workshop, Pala delle Convertite, small Tobias and Raphael pass in front of the main subject, 1490s

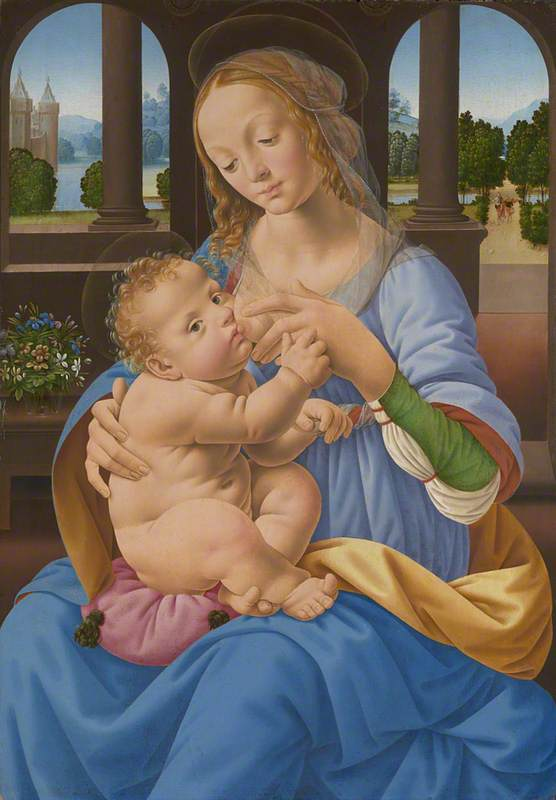
Lorenzo di Credi, Virgin and Child, with Tobias and the Angel walking in the garden at top right

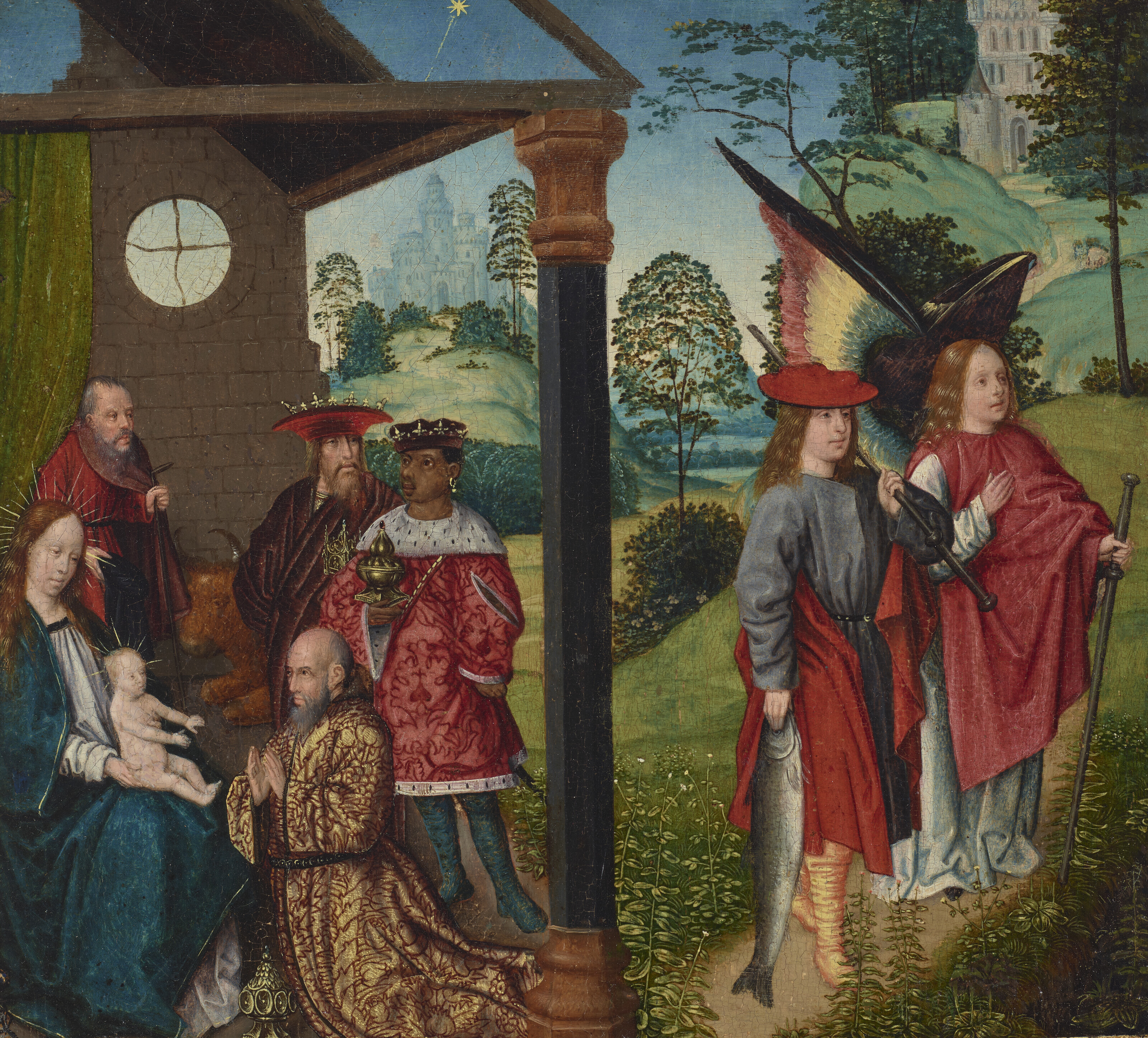
Jan Provoost, Adoration of the Shepherds with Tobias and the Angel, around 1500

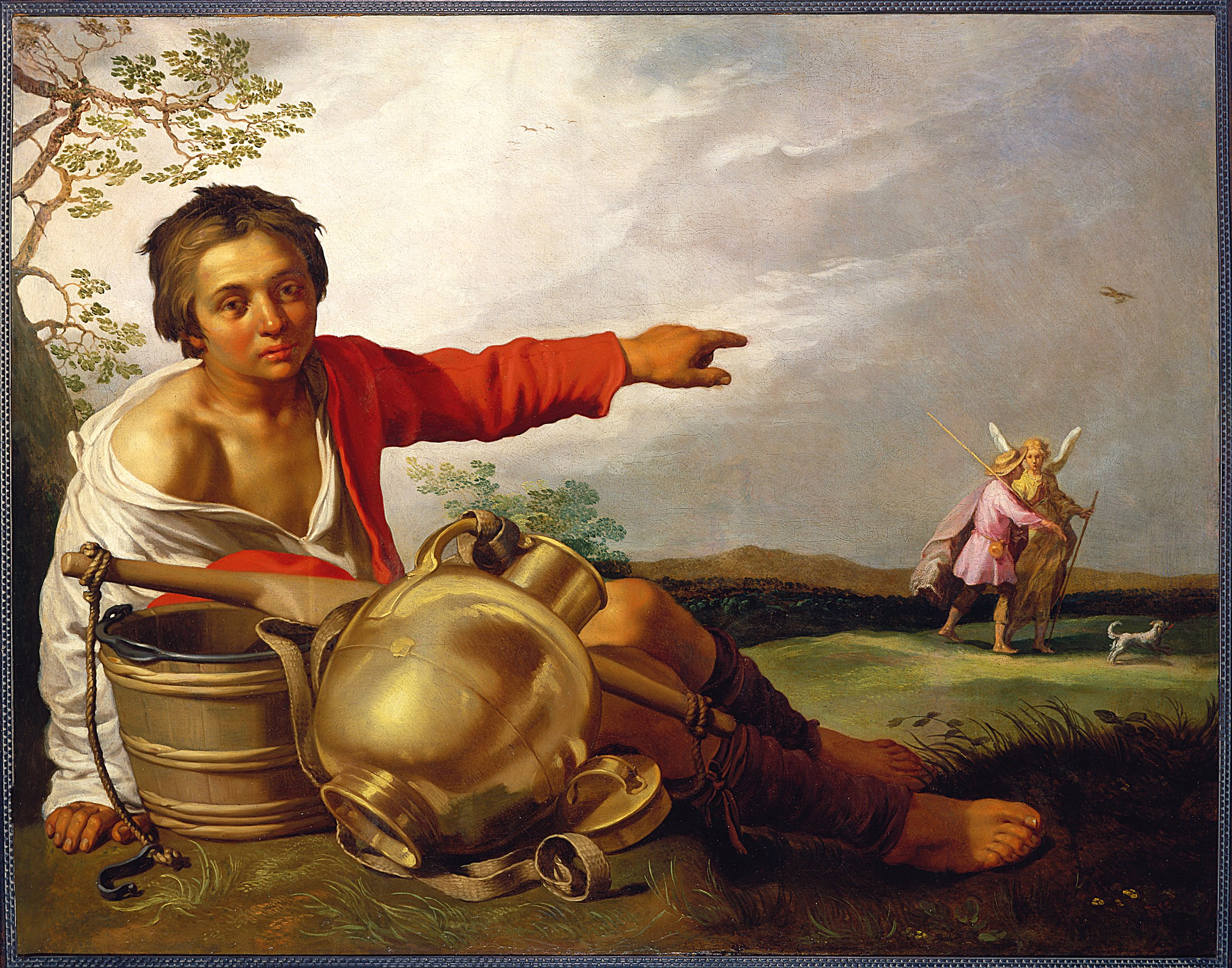
Abraham Bloemaert, Shepherd Boy Pointing at Tobias and the Angel, 1620s

=== Altarpieces and sacra conversazione compositions ===
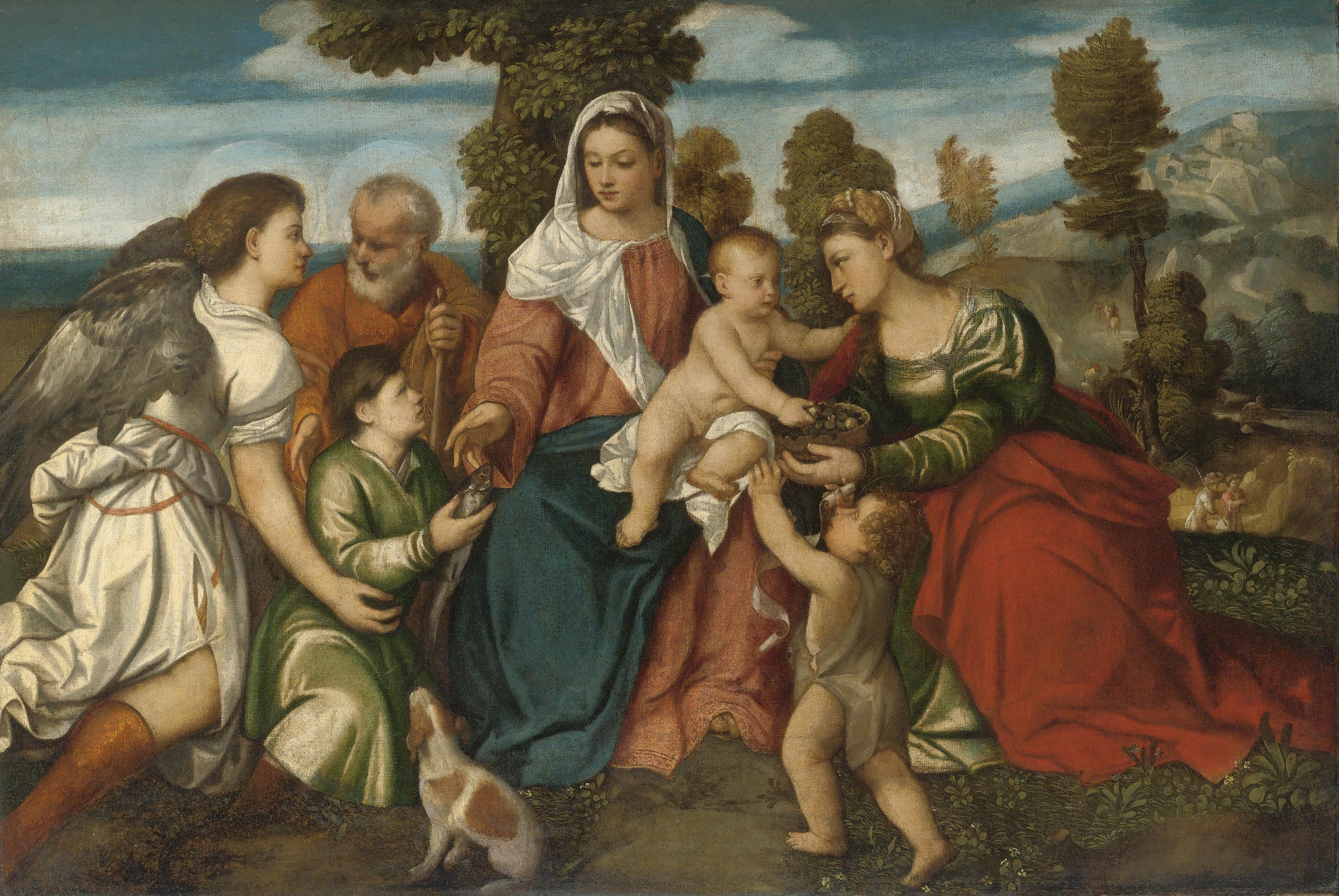
Bonifacio de' Pitati, the Holy Family and others, in a sacra conversazione

In a number of larger paintings such as altarpieces and sacra conversazioni Tobias, with his fish and dog, can be considered as attributes of Raphael, who is treated as a saint with other saints, while providing additional interest to the viewer. Of the other major archangels in the Catholic hierarchy of angels, Archangel Michael is easy to recognize, in armour with a weapon, often standing on a dragon representing Satan, and he may carry scales to represent his role in the Last Judgement. Gabriel carries a stem of lilies, traditionally part of the iconography of the Annunciation, his most significant work as the messenger of God.

But more than inanimate attributes, Tobias and his own attributes of the dog and fish sometimes interact with the main figures. In (the painter) Raphael's Madonna with the Fish (Prado) Tobias is shown being presented to the Virgin, who seems to take a polite interest in his fish, and in Girolamo dai Libri's Madonna of the Umbrella the boy has attracted the attention of the Christ child, while the dog seems rather self-conscious, stranded at the front of the group. In the Mannerist painting of the three archangels by Michele Tosini, Michael has not finished off his dragon, to the alarm of Tobias.

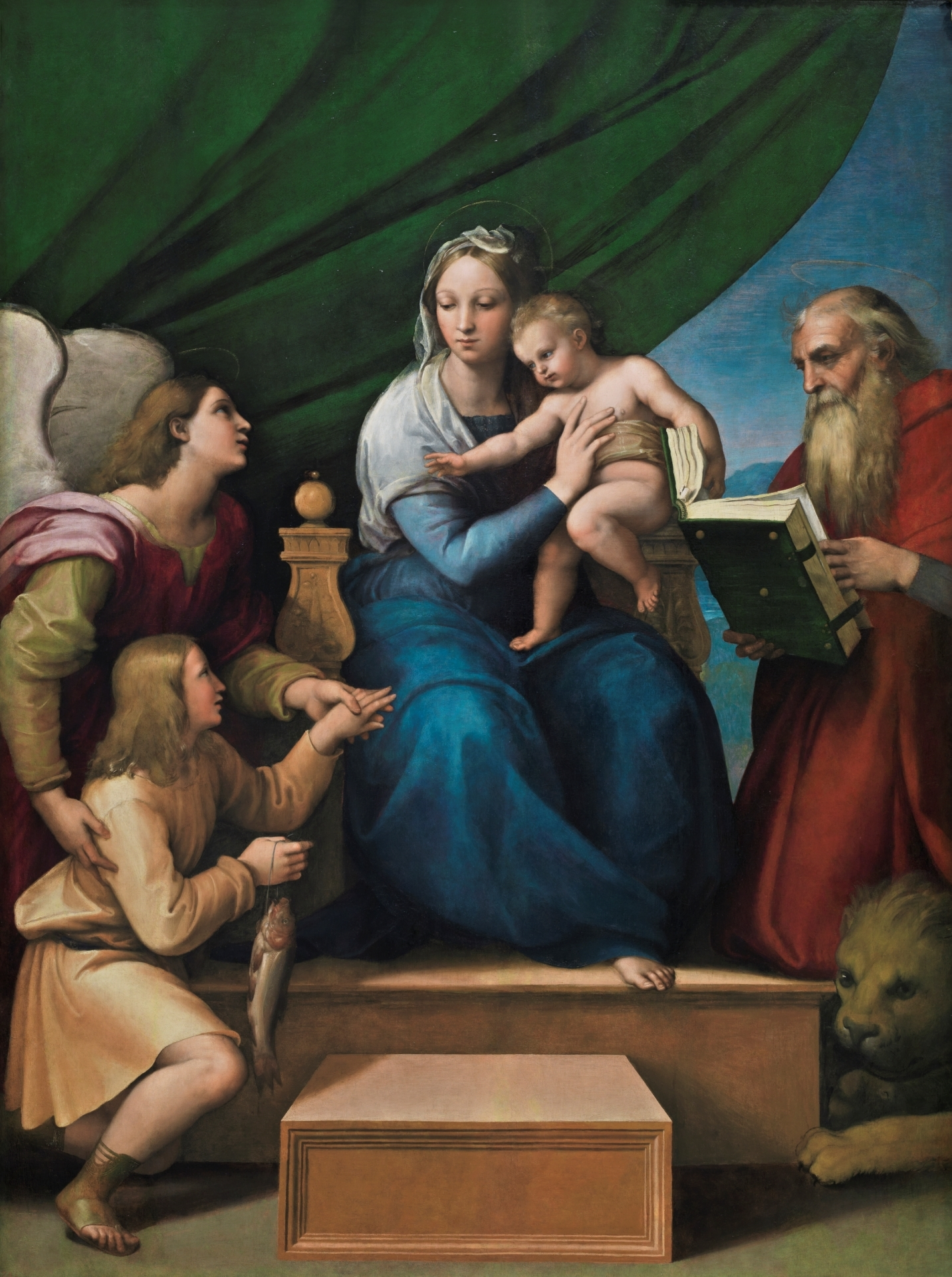
Madonna with the Fish, Raphael, c. 1513

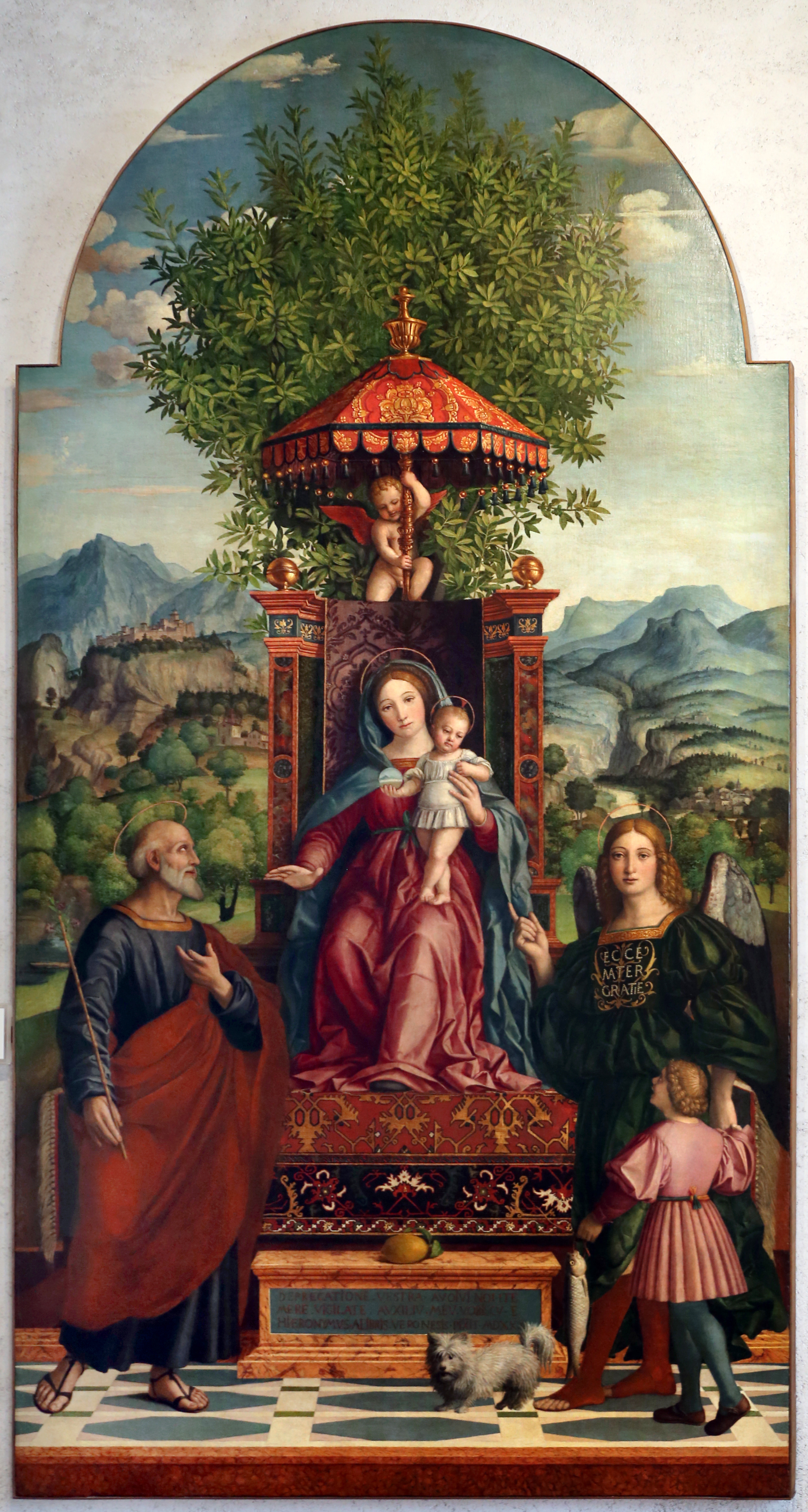
Madonna of the Umbrella, Girolamo dai Libri, 1530s

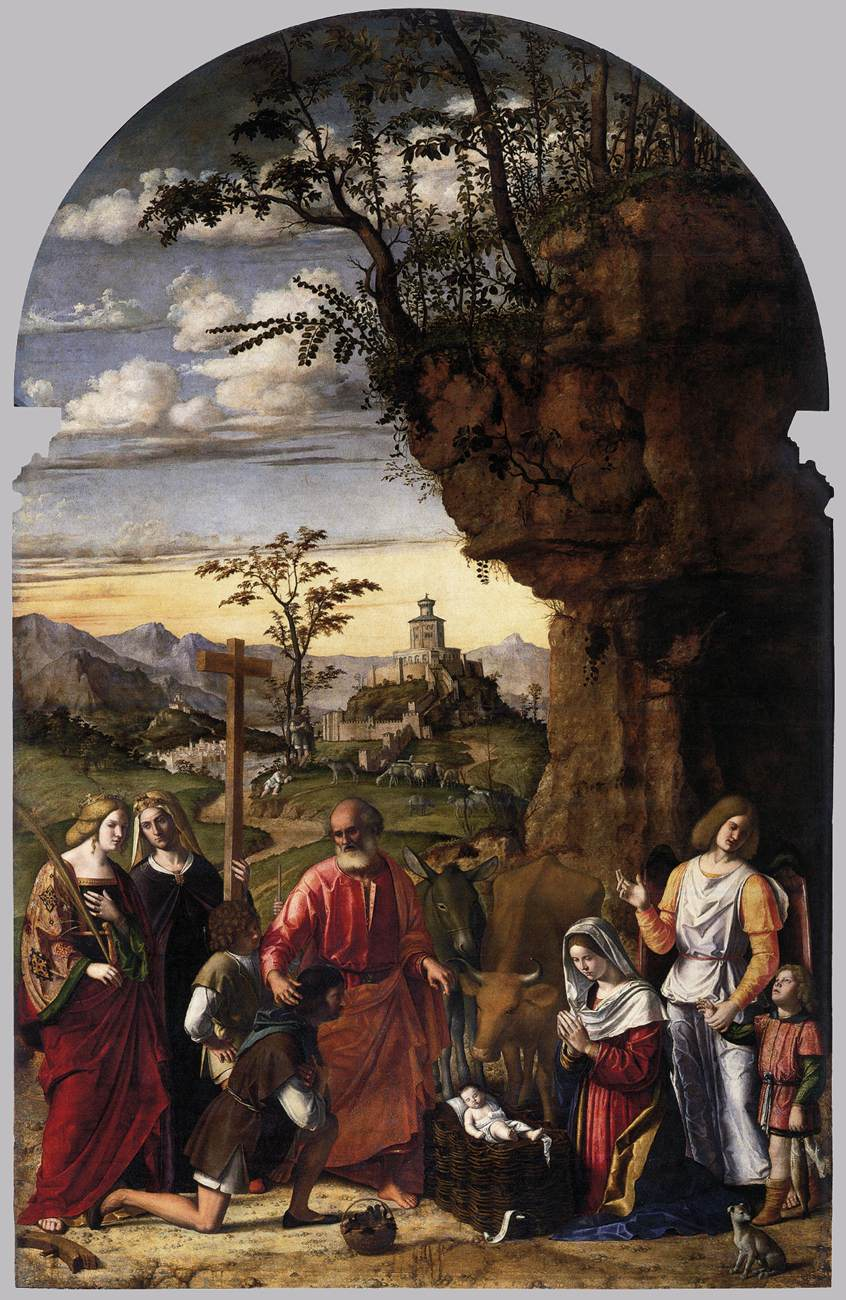
Cima da Conegliano, Adoration of the Shepherds with saints, c. 1510

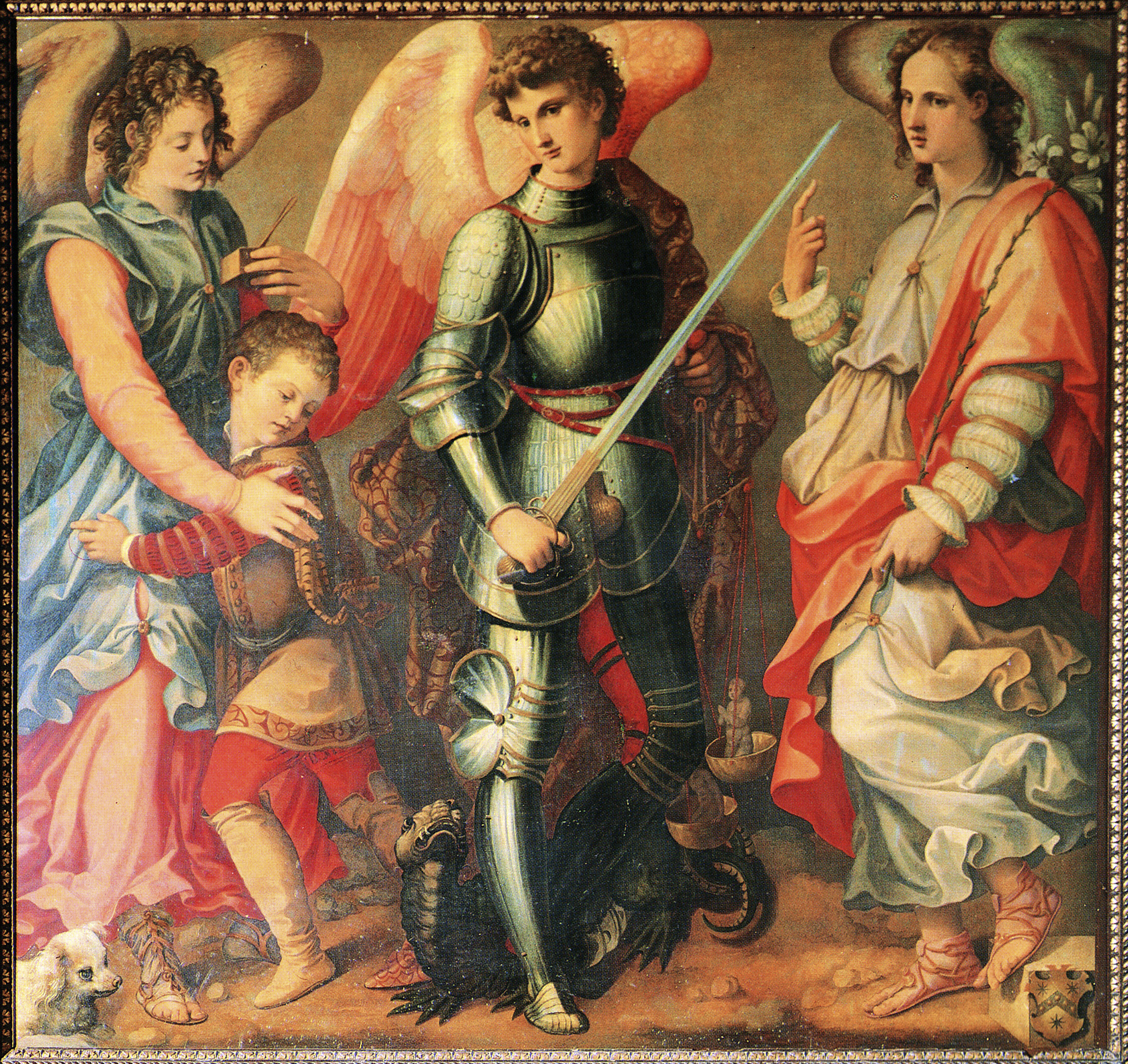
Michele Tosini, Archangels Raphael, Michael and Gabriel, showing their attributes

== Other media ==
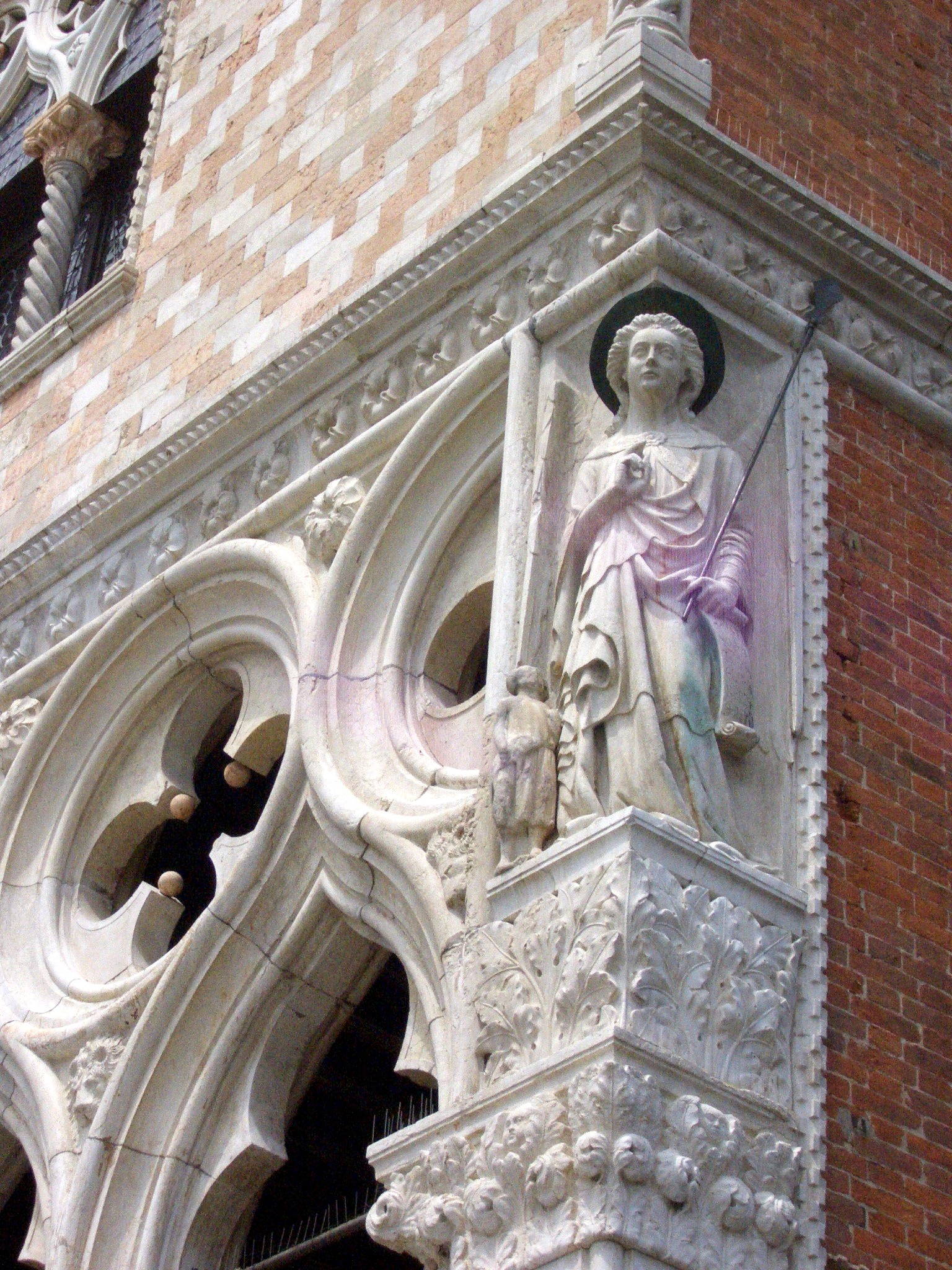
Gothic corner, Doge's Palace, Venice, Raphael's scroll reads "Efficia fretum quietum" ("Keep the Gulf quiet").

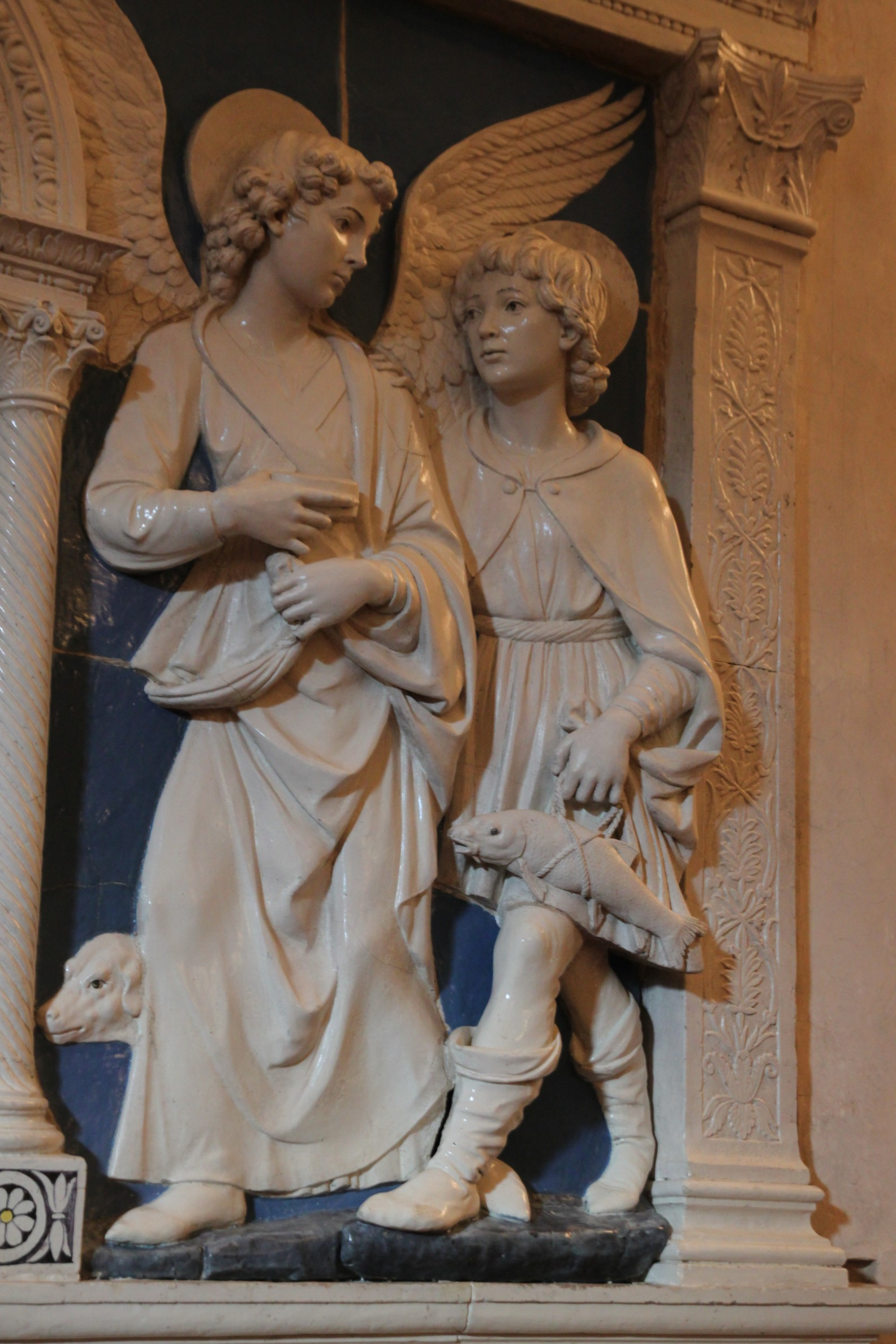
Andrea della Robbia, c. 1475, part of a glazed terracotta tabernacle

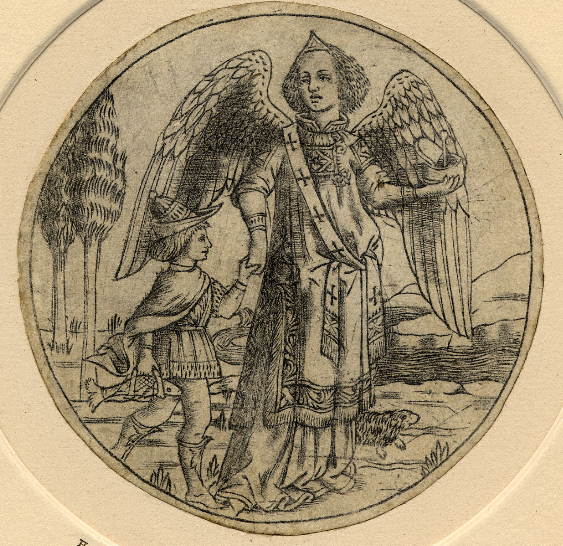
Engraving from the Otto prints, Florence, around 1475

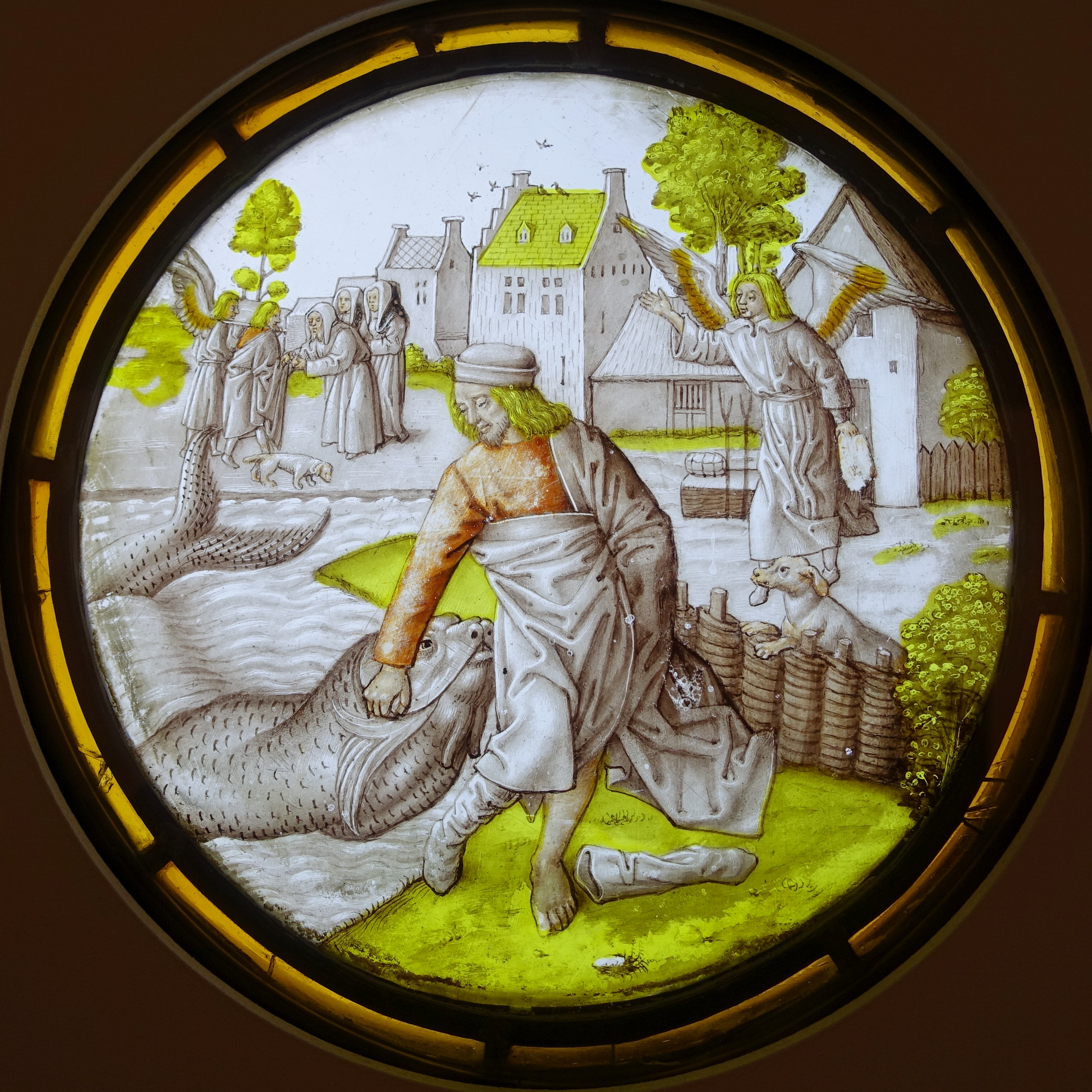
Stained glass, Netherlands, c. 1500, the departure (or return) in the background

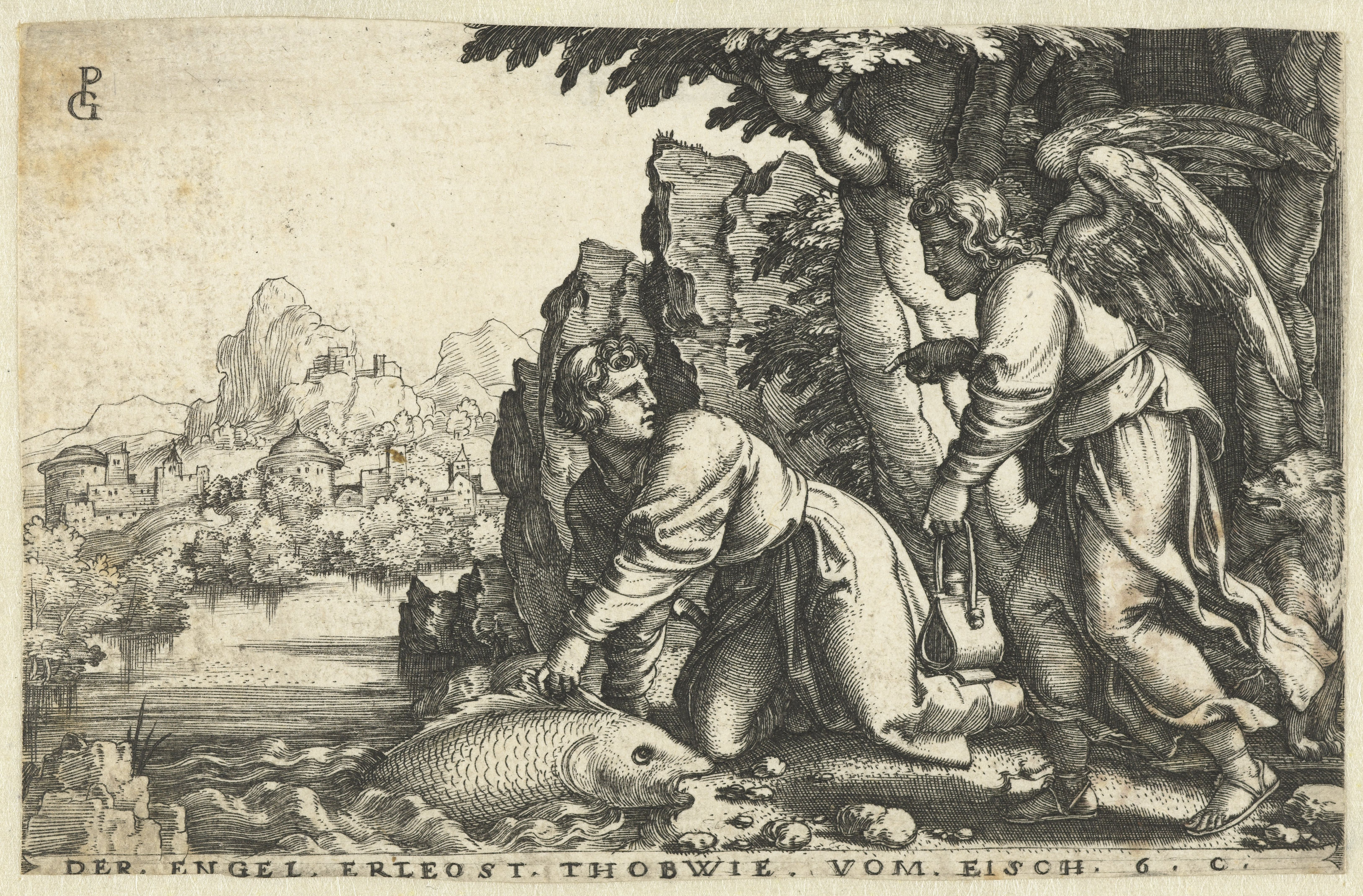
Engraving, Georg Pencz, 1543, 63 x 101 mm

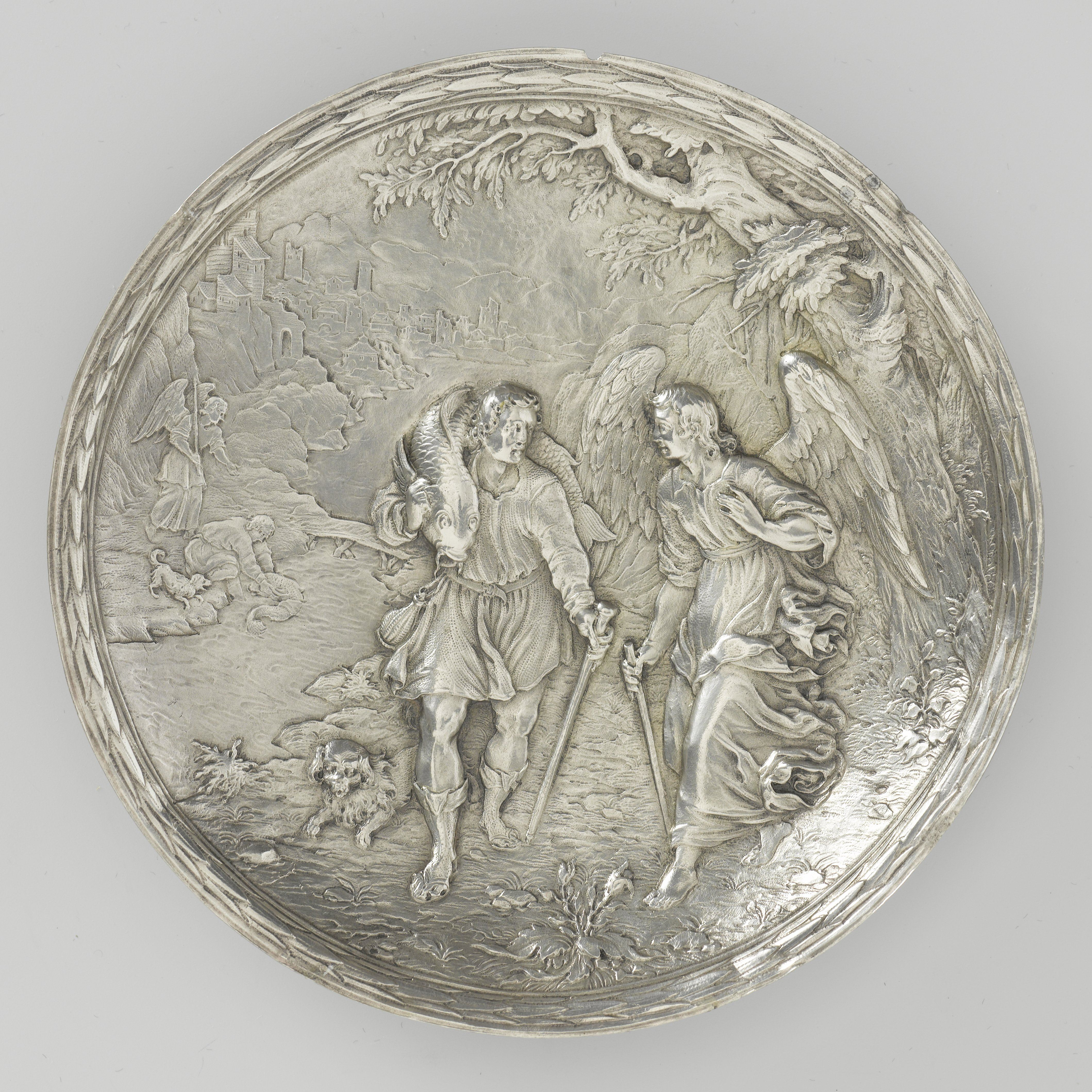
Silver plaquette by Matthäus Merian the Elder, 1627-1650 (they appear twice)

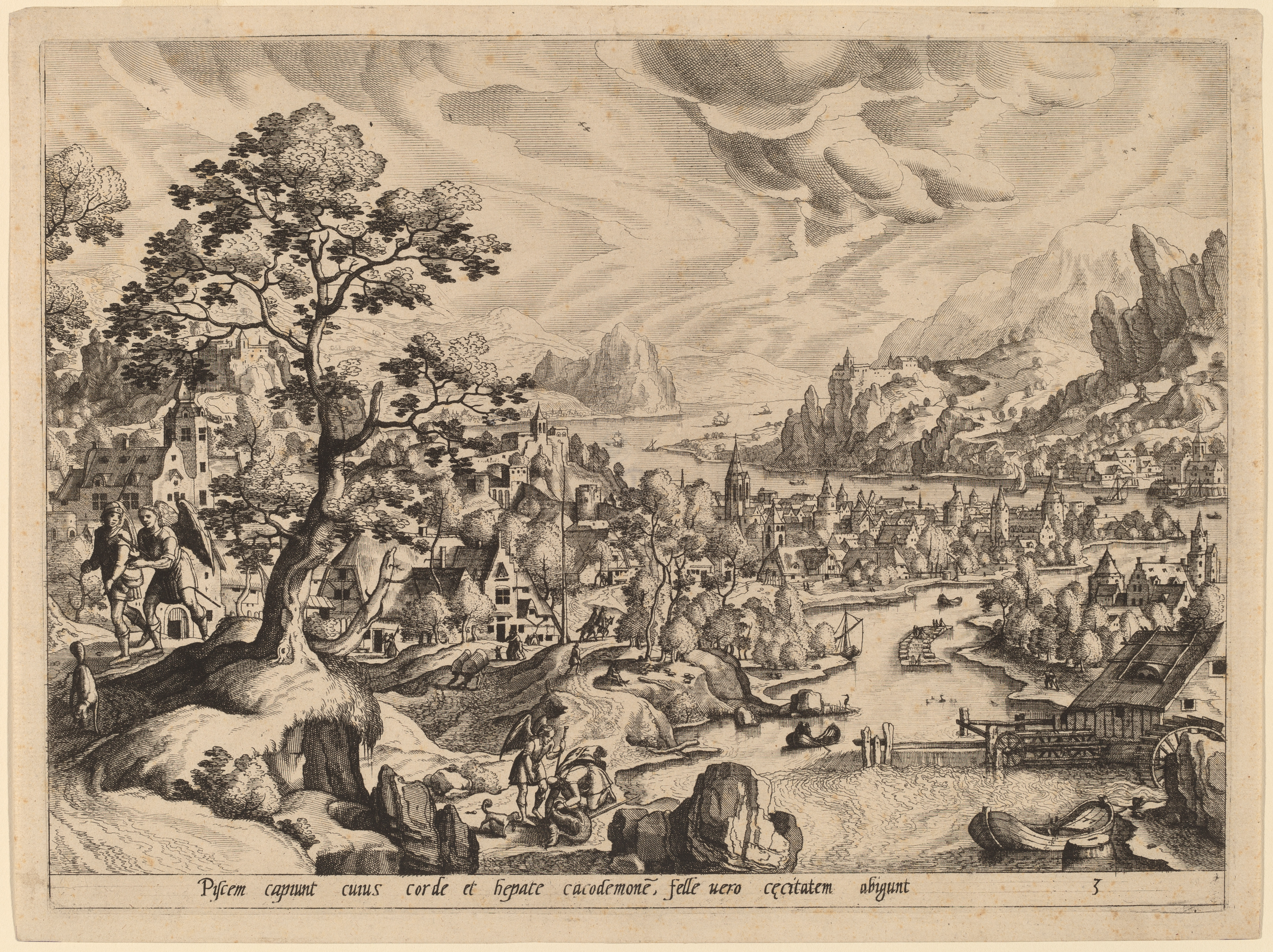
Engraving and etching by Gerard de Jode after Hans Bol, by 1591 (they appear twice)

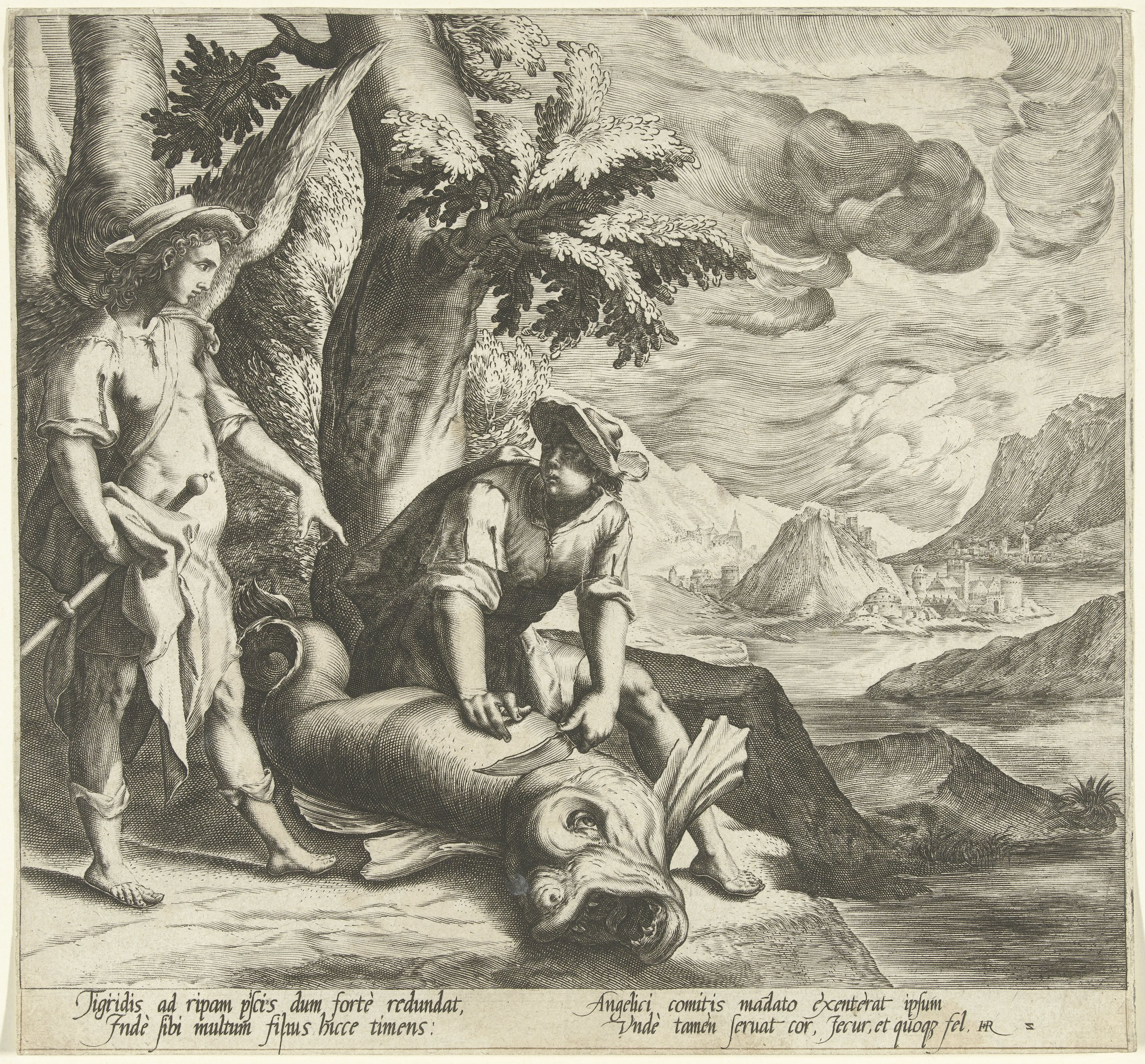
Gutting the fish, engraving c. 1590 by Jacob de Gheyn II, after Karel van Mander

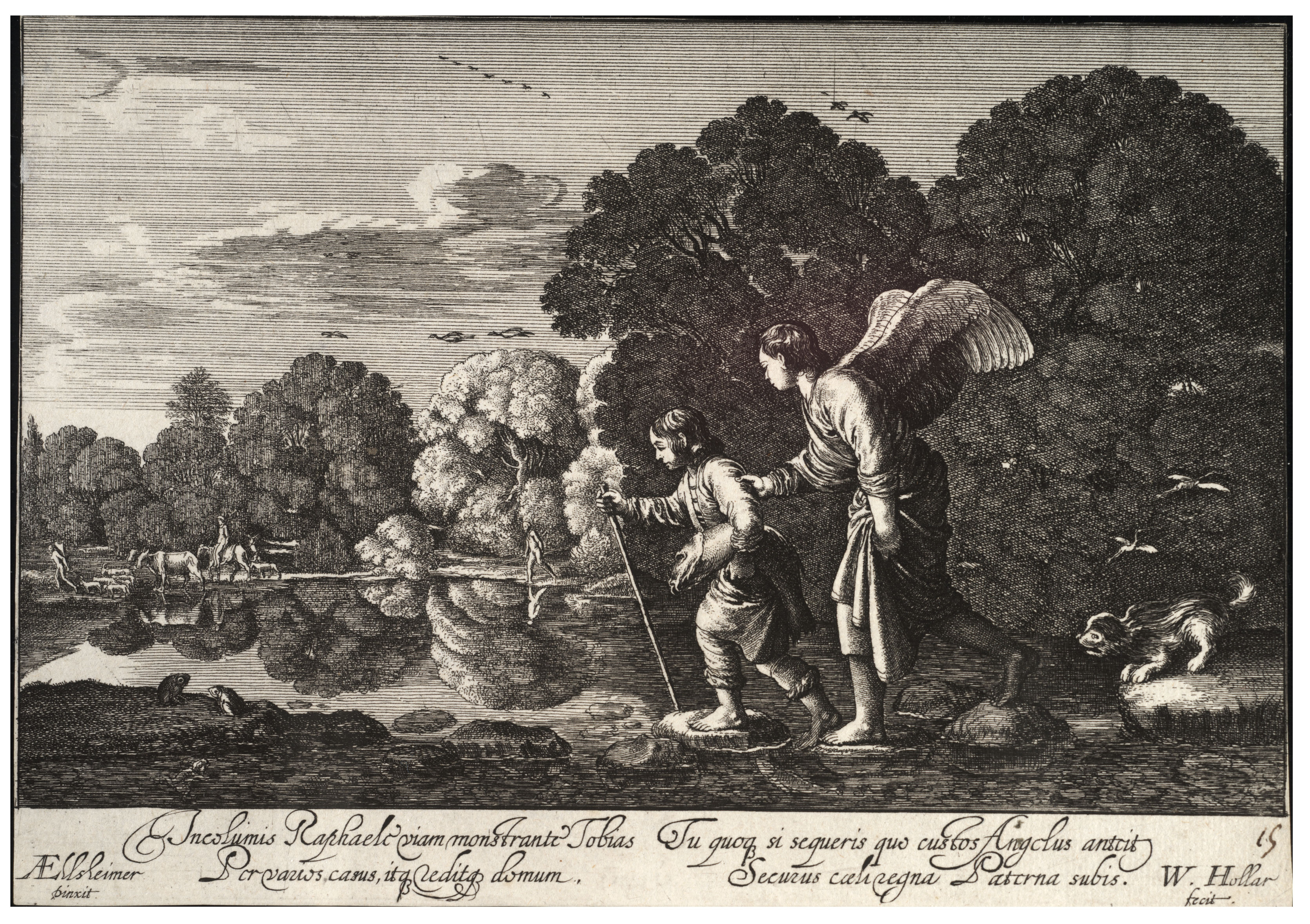
Wenceslaus Hollar, Tobias and the Angel, copying a painting by Adam Elsheimer

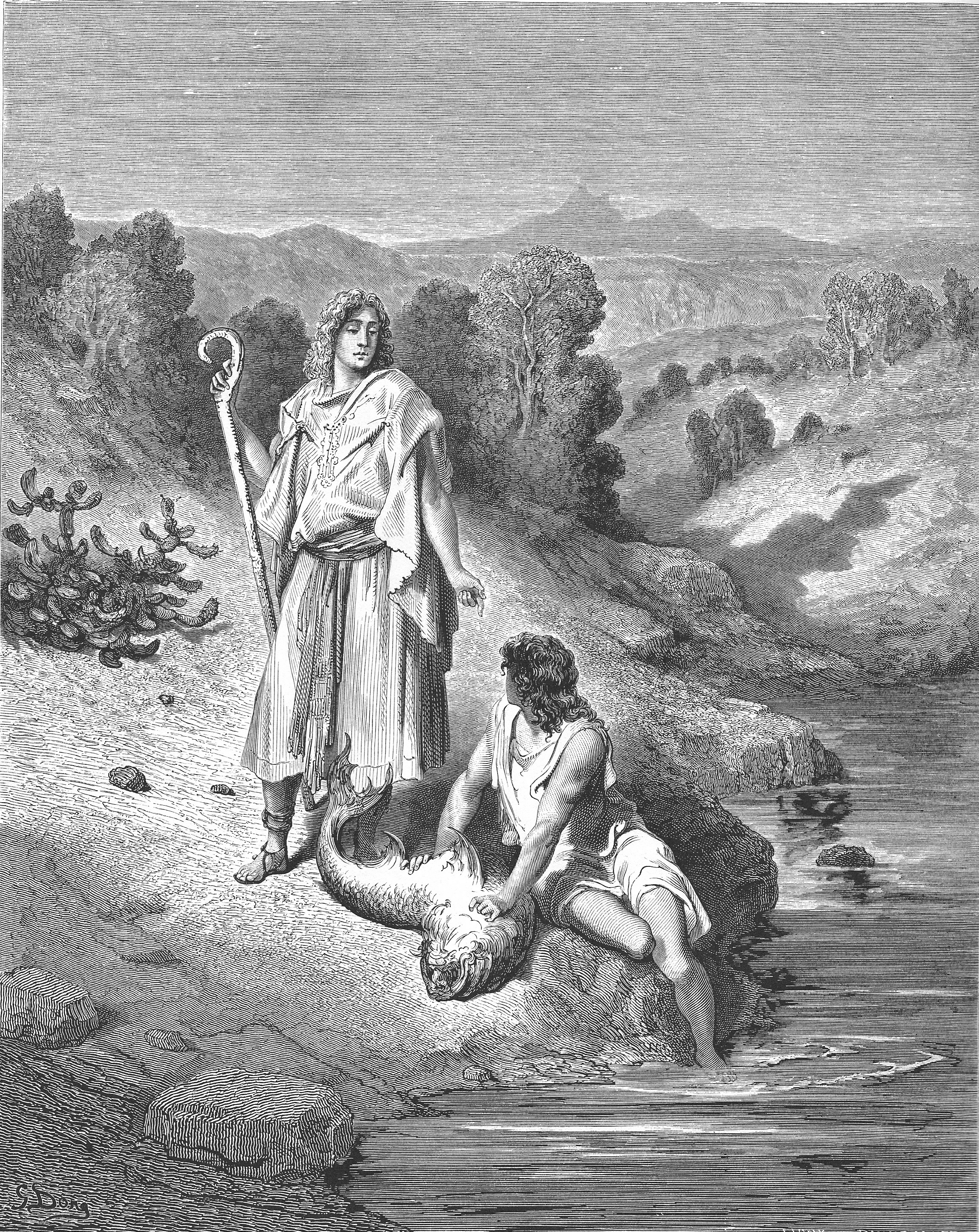
Bible illustration by Gustave Doré, 1866

== Literature and theatre ==
- Tobias and the Angel (1930), play by James Bridie (1888–1951)
- Tobias and the Angel (opera) (1999), community opera
- Tobias and the Angel, 1975 novel by Frank Yerby
