= Tobias and the Angel (Pollaiuolo) =

Painting by Antonio and Piero del Pollaiuolo

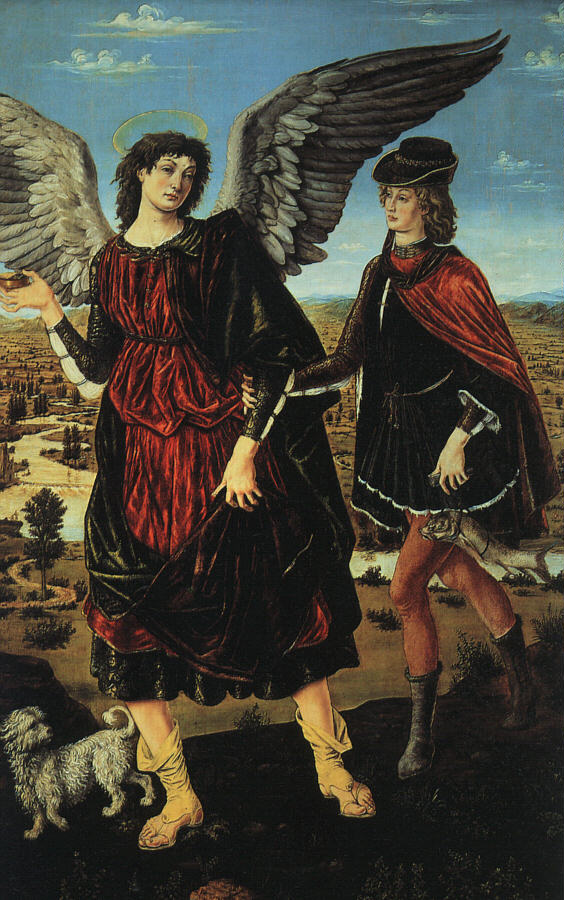
- Artist: Antonio and Piero del Pollaiuolo
- Year: c. 1465–1470
- Medium: Oil on panel
- Dimensions: 187 cm × 118 cm (74 in × 46 in)
- Location: Galleria Sabauda, Turin

Tobias and the Angel is an oil painting on panel of c. 1465–1470 by the Italian artists Antonio and Piero del Pollaiuolo, in the Galleria Sabauda in Turin. It was probably the first in a series of Florentine paintings of Tobias and the Angel with similar features, especially a wide landscape background, a small fluffy white dog, and a very expensively dressed, and very young, figure of Tobias.

The painting was mentioned by Giorgio Vasari as hanging on a pillar in the church of Orsanmichele in Florence, though he erroneously described it as being painted on canvas. Rediscovered in the Palazzo Tolomei on via Ginori in Florence by Gaetano Milanesi, it was acquired by Baron Hector de Garriod in 1865 for its present owner.
