= Raphael (archangel) =

Archangel found in Abrahamic religions

Saint Raphael
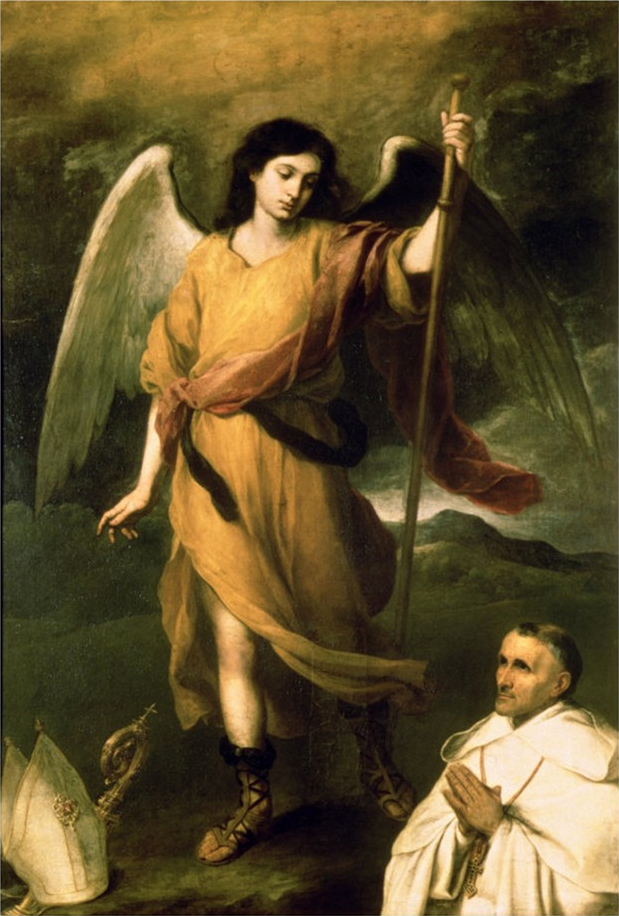
- Saint Raphael the Archangel by Bartolomé Esteban Murillo

Archangel, "Angel of Tobit"
- Venerated in: Judaism; Christianity (Catholic Church; Eastern Orthodox Church; Oriental Orthodox Church; Lutheran Churches; Anglican Communion; Methodism); Islam
- Feast: 29 September; 24 October (local calendars and by those observing the 1921–1969 General Roman Calendar); 3 Kouji Nabot; 13 Koiak (Coptic Churches)
- Attributes: holding a bottle or flask; walking with Tobias; sounding a trumpet; carrying a fish or a staff
- Patronage: travelers; lovers; the youth; finding one's spouse; ordained marriage; mental health; healing; guardian angels; shepherds; pharmacists; druggists; nurses; physicians; illness; eye afflictions; the sick; the blind; against nightmares; Diocese of Madison, Wisconsin; Archdiocese of Dubuque, Iowa; Archdiocese of Seattle, Washington; Abra de Ilog, Calaca, Batangas, Mindoro Occidental, Philippines; Aloguinsan, Cebu, Philippines, Brazil (As Protective Angel)

Raphael (UK: /ˈræfeɪəl/ RAF-ay-əl, US: /ˈræfiəl, ˈreɪf-/ RA(Y)F-ee-əl; "God has healed") (Note: Hebrew: רְפָאֵל, Rəfāʾēl, Tiberian: Răp̄āʾēl; lit. 'God has healed'; Ancient Greek: Ραφαήλ, Raphaḗl; Coptic: ⲣⲁⲫⲁⲏⲗ, Rafaêl; Arabic: رفائيل, Rafāʾīl, or إسرافيل, Isrāfīl; Amharic: ሩፋኤል, Rufaʾel.) is an archangel first mentioned in the Book of Tobit and in 1 Enoch, both estimated to date from between the 3rd and 2nd century BC. In later Jewish tradition, he became identified as one of the three heavenly visitors entertained by Abraham at the Oak of Mamre. He is not named in either the New Testament or the Quran, but later Christian tradition identified him with healing and as the angel who stirred waters in the Pool of Bethesda in John 5:2–4, and in Islam, where his name is Israfil, he is understood to be the unnamed angel of Quran 6:73, standing eternally with a trumpet to his lips, ready to announce the Day of Judgment. In Gnostic tradition, Raphael is represented on the Ophite Diagram. Raphael is an archangel of healing.

== Origins in post-exilic literature ==
In the Hebrew Bible, the word Hebrew: מַלְאָךְ (mal'ākh) means messenger or representative; either human or supernatural in nature. When used in the latter sense it is translated as "angel". The original mal'akh lacked both individuality and hierarchy, but after the Babylonian exile they were graded into a Babylonian-style hierarchy and the word archangelos, archangel, first appears in the Greek text of 1 Enoch. At the same time the angels and archangels began to be given names, as attested in the Talmudic statement that "the names of the angels were brought by the Jews from Babylonia", attributed to Shimon ben Lakish or Rabbi Hanina respectively.

Raphael first appears in two works of this period, 1 Enoch, a collection of originally independent texts from the 3rd century BC, and the Book of Tobit, from the early 2nd century BC. In the oldest stratum of 1 Enoch (1 Enoch 9:1) he is one of the four named archangels, and in Tobit 12:11–15 he is one of seven.

His name derives from the Hebrew root רפא (r-p-ʾ) meaning "to heal", and can be translated as "God has healed". In Tobit he goes by the name Azariah (Hebrew: עֲזַרְיָה/עֲזַרְיָהוּ ʿĂzaryāh/ʿĂzaryāhū, "Yah/Yahu has helped") while disguising himself as a human. In the text he acts as a physician and expels demons, using an extraordinary fish to bind the demon Asmodeus and to heal Tobit's eyes, while in 1 Enoch he is "set over all disease and every wound of the children of the people", and binds the armies of Azazel and throws them into the valley of fire.

== In post-biblical Judaism ==
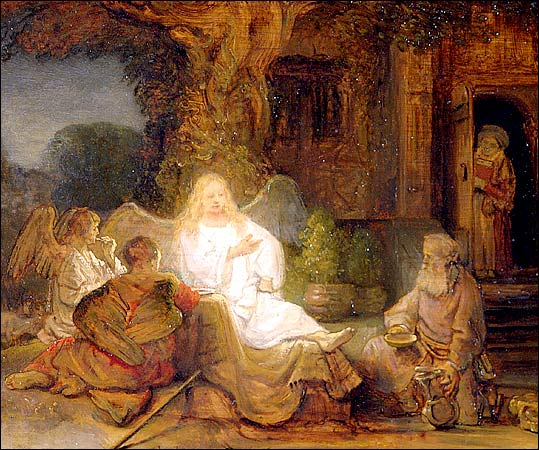
Abraham with the Three Angels by Rembrandt

According to the Babylonian Talmud, Raphael (Hebrew: רְפָאֵל Rəfāʾēl, Tiberian: Răp̄āʾēl) was one of the three angels who appeared to Abraham in the oak grove of Mamre in the region of Hebron (Genesis 18; Bava Metzia 86b); Michael, as the greatest, walked in the middle, with Gabriel to his right, and Raphael to his left (Yoma 37a). Each was commanded to carry out a specific mission, Gabriel to destroy Sodom, Michael to inform Sarah that she would give birth to Isaac, Raphael to heal Abraham from his recent circumcision and save Lot. Rashi writes, "Although Raphael's mission included two tasks, they were considered a single mission since they were both acts that saved people." The Life of Adam and Eve lists him with the archangels Michael, Gabriel, Uriel, and Joel, and the medieval Jewish philosopher Maimonides included his name in his Jewish angelic hierarchy.

In Midrash Konen, it is revealed that Raphael was originally once named Libbiel (Hebrew: לִבִּיאֵל Lībbīʾēl; Meaning: "God is my heart"). In the Midrash, God takes council with His Angels before he creates Adam the first Man. The Angels were not all of one opinion however, with differing views and reasons. The Angel of Love and Angel of Justice both favoured Man's creation as he would be affectionate and loving, alongside practicing Justice. The Angel of Truth and the Angel of Peace opposed his creation however, as he would be full of lies and be quarrelsome. To invalidate his protest, God cast the Angel of Truth down from Heaven to Earth, and when the others cried out against the treatment of their companion, He said, "Truth will spring back out of the earth." Before their objections, God had only told the Angels of the good there would be among Humans, but not of the evil too. Despite not knowing the whole truth, the Angels were nevertheless prompted to cry out: "What is man, that Thou art mindful of him? And the son of man, that Thou visitest him?" God replied: "The fowl of the air and the fish of the sea, what were they created for? Of what avail a larder full of appetizing dainties, and no guest to enjoy them?" And the Angels could not but exclaim: "O Lord, our Lord, how excellent is Thy name in all the earth! Do as is pleasing in Thy sight." For not a few of the Angels their opposition bore fatal consequences. When God summoned the band under the Archangel Michael, and asked their opinion on the creation of man, they answered scornfully: "What is man, that Thou art mindful of him? And the son of man, that Thou visitest him?" God thereupon stretched forth His little finger, and all were consumed by fire except their Chief Michael. And the same fate befell the band under the leadership of the Archangel Gabriel; he alone of all was saved from destruction. The third band consulted was commanded by the Archangel Libbiel. Taught by the horrible fate of his predecessors, he warned his troop: "You have seen what misfortune overtook the Angels who said 'What is man, that Thou art mindful of him?' Let us have a care not to do likewise, lest we suffer the same dire punishment. For God will not refrain from doing in the end what He has planned. Therefore it is advisable for us to yield to His wishes." Thus warned, the Angels spoke: "Lord of the world, it is well that Thou hast thought of creating man. Do Thou create him according to Thy will. And as for us, we will be his attendants and his ministers, and reveal unto him all our secrets." Thereupon God changed the Archangel Libbiel's name to Raphael, the Rescuer, because his Host of Angels had been rescued by his sage advice. He was appointed the Angelic Prince of Healing, who has in his safe-keeping all the celestial remedies, the types of the medical remedies used on Earth.

In the Midrash Tanhuma, Satan becomes envious of the righteous R. Matthew bar Heresh after seeing him sitting occupied in Torah study, without looking at anyone's wife or any other woman. Believing it to be impossible for a righteous man to exist in the world without sin, Satan asks God how He views Rabbi Matthew; He sees him as completely righteous. Satan then asks for permission to test R. Matthew, which is granted to him. Satan then takes the form of a beautiful woman upon finding the Rabbi studying Torah. After seeing that Satan would continue to try and tempt him from all sides; he used hot pins to blind himself lest his evil inclination prevail. Satan then trembled in dismay and reported back to God. Immediately upon hearing this, God called Raphael, Prince of the Healing Arts, commanding him to heal the eyes of R. Matthew bar Heresh. When Raphael goes to R. Matthew and reveals his identity and mission, the Rabbi states that he does not wish to be healed. Raphael then returns to God informing Him of this. Upon hearing this God commands Raphael to tell the Rabbi not to fear, for his evil inclination will not prevail. When he heard this from the mouth of the angel, he accepted his healing and was not afraid.

In Rabbeinu Bahya, a commentary on the Torah written by Rabbi Bahya ben Asher (1255–1340), the Camp of Ephraim, situated to the west of the Tabernacle (Numbers 2:18), corresponded to the celestial camp headed by the archangel Raphael supported by the angels Zavdiel and Achziel. It is also said that this was the camp that Moses alluded to when he prayed that Miriam be healed from her tzaraath by saying "please God heal her" (Numbers 12:13). He appealed to the attribute represented by Raphael.

It is said in Kav HaYashar by Rabbi Tzvi Hirsch Kaidanover (1648–1712), that when the angels appointed to bring infirmity and sickness upon people behold the angel Raphael, they take fright and flee. Then Raphael extends healing to the invalid.

In the Beginning of Wisdom, an introduction to kabbalistic thought composed by Rabbi Aharon Meir Altshuler (1835–1905) in Warsaw between 1887–1893; Raphael is said to correspond to the Sephirah of Tiphereth (Beauty). He is said to act as an intermediate conduct between Chesed (Kindness) corresponding to Michael, and Din (Judgement) corresponding to Gabriel. Uriel (alternatively named Nuriel) is also said to act as an intermediate conduct alongside Raphael. It is further explained that when he inclines toward Chesed he is called Uriel, but when he inclines toward Din he is called Nuriel. In the same context, the Sefer HaBahir calls Raphael the "Prince of Peace" (Hebrew: שַׂר־שָׁלוֹם Śar Šālōm). The text states that his reconciliation between Michael, the prince to God's right, and Gabriel, the prince to God's left is the meaning of the verse, "He imposes peace in His heights" (Job 25:2). With Raphael being the Archangel of Air that establishes peace between Fire and Water.

In kabbalistic astrology, Raphael is most commonly associated with the Sun (alongside Michael) and the planet Mercury. The Zohar also associates him with the image of man in the tetramorph of the four holy living creatures of the Prophet Ezekiel's vision, alongside the zodiac sign of Aquarius, and in relation to the image of man; the Sephirah of Malkhuth (Kingdom) and the Earth. As well as Tiphereth and Malkhuth, the Zohar also has Raphael corresponding to the Sephirah of Hod (Majesty), the Euphrates river (Hebrew: פְרָת Pərāt, Tiberian: Părāṯ; the fourth river of Eden in Genesis) the left leg of the body, and the Israelite Tribe of Ephraim. The text states: "The fourth (river) is Hod (Majesty), the "left leg" (referred to in what was said of Jacob, that "he halted on his left thigh"), and from it shall drink the camp of Raphael, whose mission is to heal the ills of the captivity, and with it the tribe of Ephraim and his two accompanying tribes (Manasseh and Benjamin)."

It is also customary in Judaism to invoke Raphael as one of the Four Archangels after one recites the Shema before going to bed; with Michael by your right side, Gabriel by your left side, Uriel before you, and Raphael behind you. This practice is also referred to in Rebbe Nachman of Breslov's (1772–1810) Likutei Etzot. In this work, he refers to the invocation of the Four Archangels as "binding the chariot".

== Christianity ==
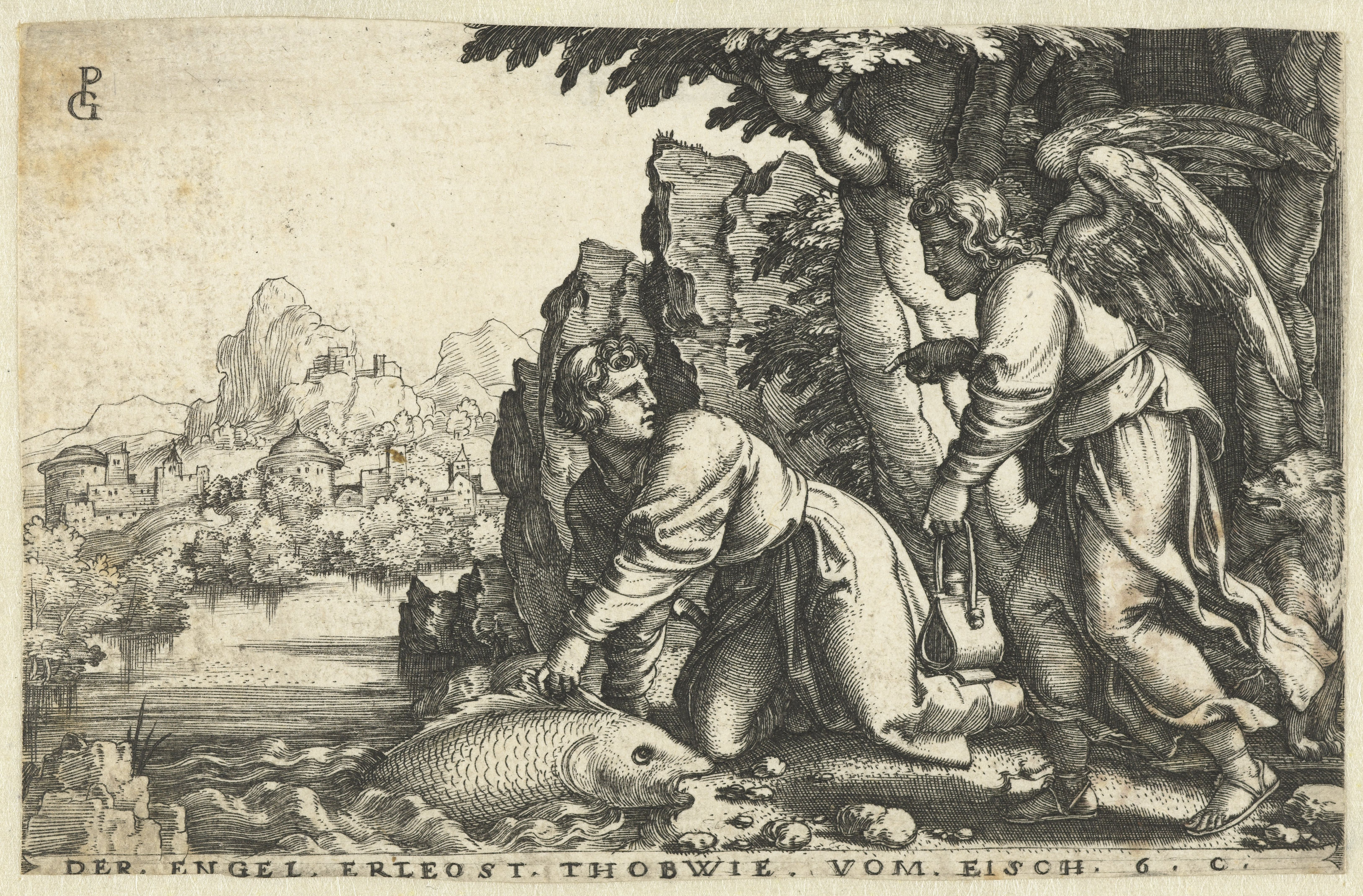
Raphael instructs Tobias to gut the large fish, engraving, Georg Pencz, 1543, 63 x 101 mm

The New Testament names only two archangels, Michael and Gabriel (Luke 1:9–26; Jude 1:9; Revelation 12:7), but Raphael, because of his association with healing, became identified with the unnamed angel of John 5:1–4 who periodically stirred the pool of Bethesda "[a]nd he that went down first into the pond after the motion of the water was made whole of whatsoever infirmity he lay under". The Catholic Church accordingly links Raphael with Michael and Gabriel as saints whose intercession can be sought through prayer.

=== Patronage ===
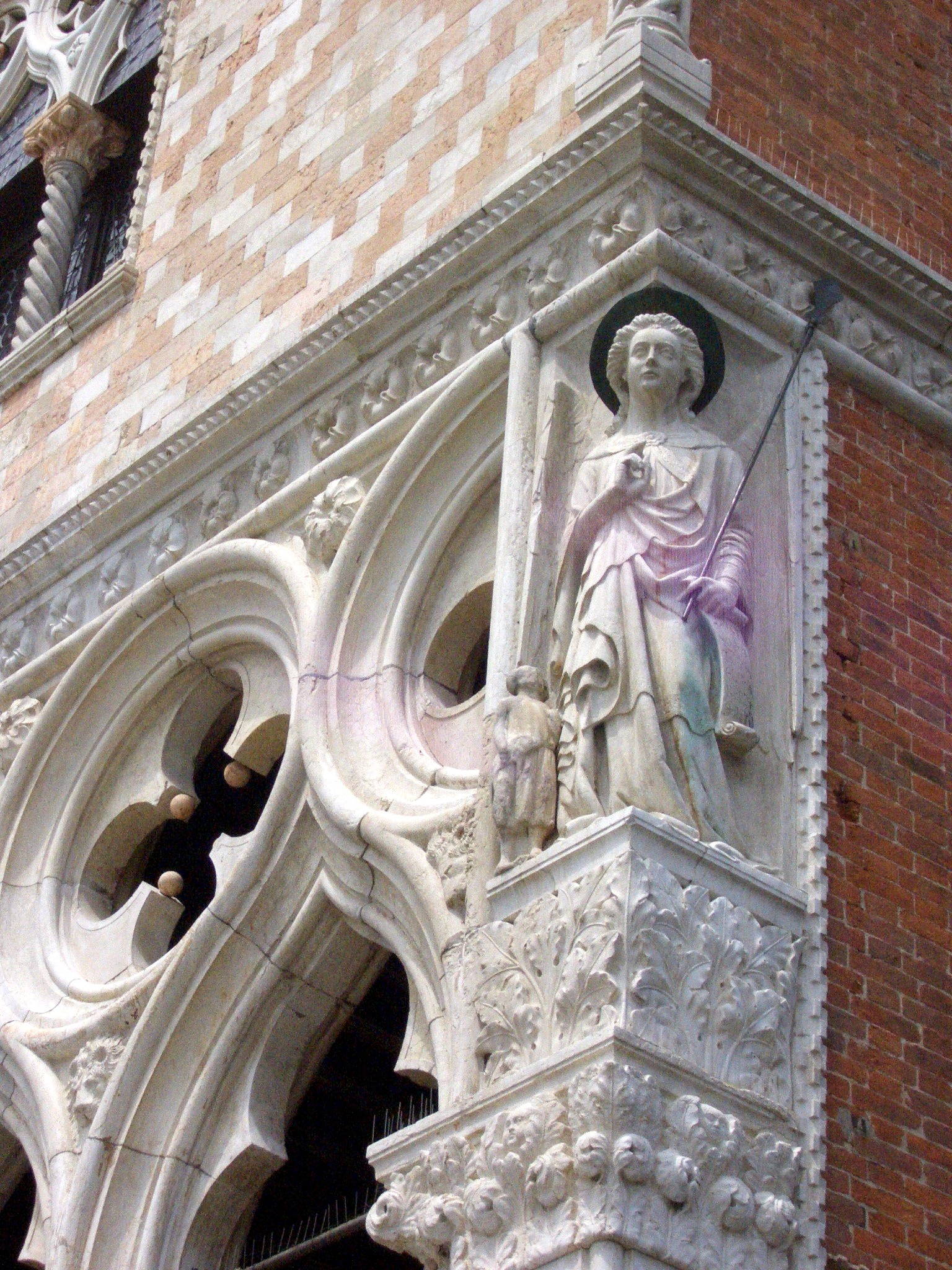
Raphael, Palazzo Ducale, Venice, detail

Due to his actions in the Book of Tobit and the Gospel of John, Raphael is considered a protector and healer, and so the patron of travelers, the blind, happy meetings, nurses, physicians, medical workers, matchmakers, Christian marriage, and Catholic studies. On a corner of the Doge's Palace in Venice is a relief depicting Raphael holding a scroll on which is written: "Efficia fretum quietum" ("Keep the Gulf quiet"). On July 8, 1497, when Vasco da Gama set sail from Lisbon with his four-ship fleet to India, the flagship was named São Rafael at the insistence of King Manuel I of Portugal. When the flotilla reached the Cape of Good Hope on October 22, the sailors debarked and erected a column in the archangel's honor. The little statue of Raphael that accompanied Da Gama on the voyage is now in the Naval Museum in Lisbon.

=== Iconography ===
He is perhaps most often seen in depictions of Tobias and the Angel, from the Book of Tobit, showing him walking with Tobias and his dog through a landscape. The subject became very popular in Italy from about 1450 for a century, as devotion to Raphael increased, at least partly through confraternities dedicated to him. In altarpieces and the like, Tobias, his fish and his dog may be used as identifying attributes of Raphael.

Raphael is said to guard pilgrims on their journeys, and when depicted as a single figure is often depicted holding a staff. He is also often depicted holding or standing on a fish, which alludes to his healing of Tobit with the fish's gall. Early mosaics often show him and the other archangels in the clothing of a Byzantine courtier.

=== Feast day ===
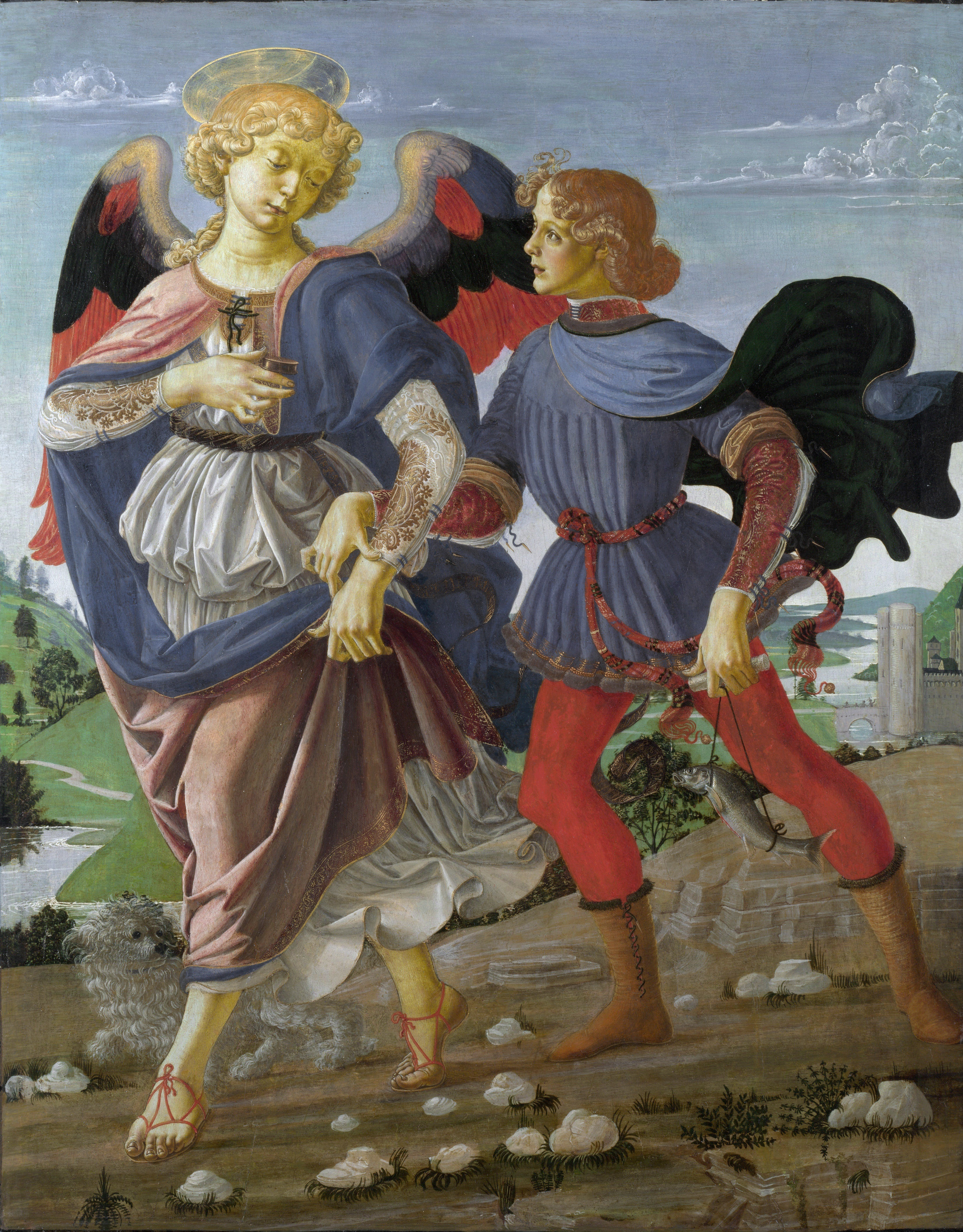
Workshop of Andrea del Verrocchio, Tobias and the Angel (c. 1470–1475)

The feast day of Raphael was included for the first time in the General Roman Calendar in 1921, for celebration on October 24. With the 1969 revision of the General Roman Calendar, the feast was transferred to September 29 for celebration together with archangels Saints Michael and Gabriel. Pope Benedict XVI's Summorum Pontificum permitted, within certain limits for public use, the General Roman Calendar of 1960, which has October 24 as Raphael's feast day.

He is commemorated in some Spanish dioceses on the old date and with a procession on 7 May in Cordoba, Spain.

In the Diocese of Warsaw-Praga he is commemorated on 3 October (with Michael and Gabriel); the feast was transferred from 29 September (Dedication of St. Florian's Cathedral).

The archangel Raphael is commemorated by the Eastern Orthodox Church on 8 November in the Synaxis of the Archangel Michael and the Other Bodiless Powers.

In the Oriental Orthodox Churches dedication of church of Saint Raphael on the back of a whale is commemorated on 26 August (3 Pagumen).

The Coptic Orthodox Church celebrates Raphael's feast on Kouji Nabot 3 and Koiak 13.

In the Antiochian Western Rite Vicariate Saint Raphael the Archangel is commemorated on 24 October.

=== Apparitions ===
The Archangel Raphael is said to have appeared in Cordoba, Spain, during the 16th century; in response to the city's appeal, Pope Innocent X allowed the local celebration of a feast in the Archangel's honor on May 7, the date of the principal apparition. Saint John of God, founder of the Hospital order that bears his name, is also said to have received visitations from Saint Raphael, who encouraged and instructed him. In tribute to this, many of the Brothers Hospitallers of St. John of God's facilities are called "Raphael Centers" to this day. The 18th century Neapolitan nun, Saint Maria Francesca of the Five Wounds, is also said to have seen apparitions of Raphael. In the Latter-day Saint tradition, Doctrine and Covenants 128:21, which is part of a letter dated September 7, 1842, refers to an appearance or manifestation of Raphael to Joseph Smith as one of several angels who had appeared to him either together or separately, each "declaring their dispensation, their rights, their keys, their honors, their majesty and glory, and the power of their priesthood; giving line upon line, precept upon precept; here a little, and there a little; giving us consolation by holding forth that which is to come, confirming our hope!" Additional details and circumstances of the visitation are not known.

== In Islam ==
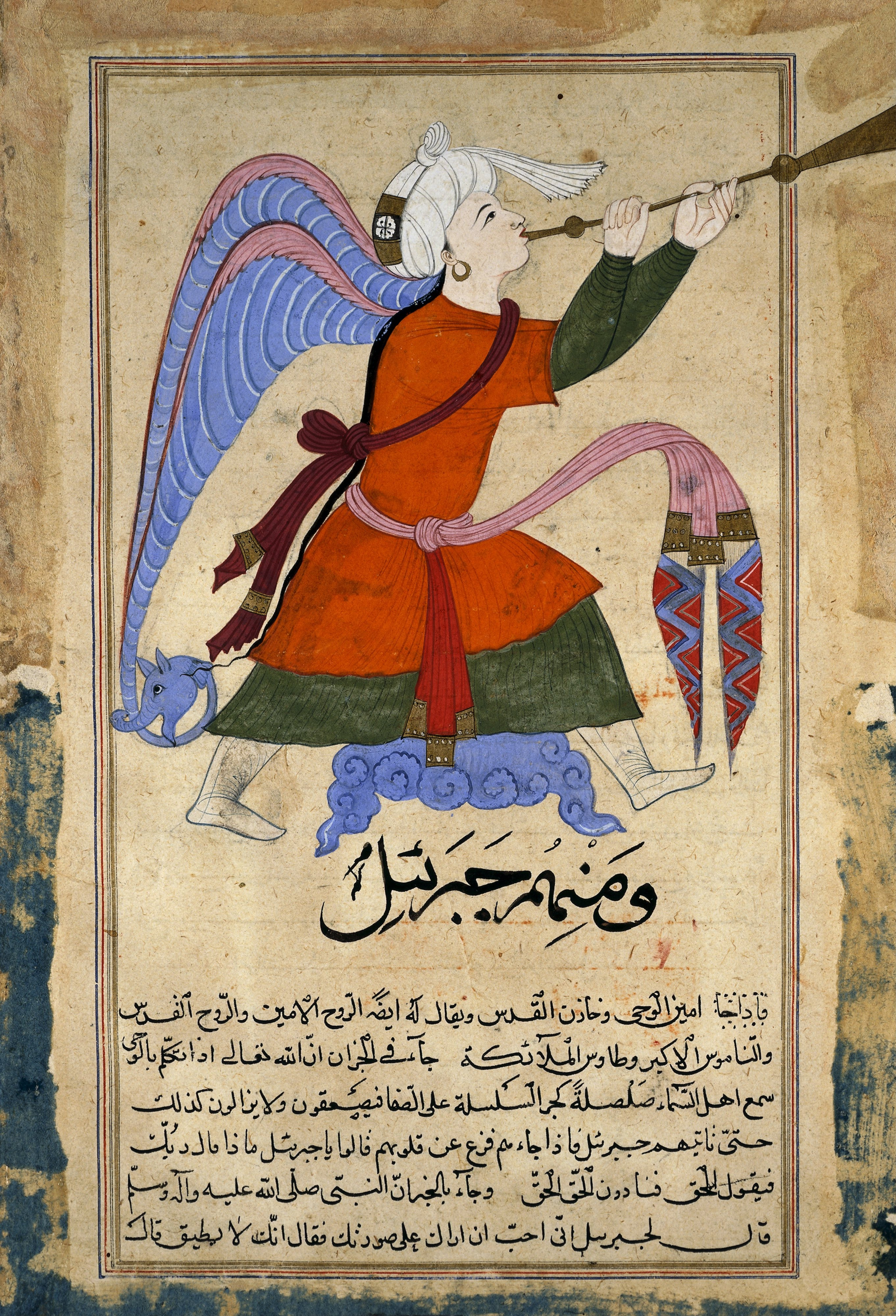
The Archangel Israfil, made in Egypt or Syria, late 14th–early 15th century

Raphael (Arabic: إسرافيل, romanized: ʾIsrāfīl, alternate spellings: Israafyl, Esrafyl) is a venerated archangel according to Islamic tradition. In Islamic eschatology, Israfil will blow the trumpet from a holy rock in Jerusalem to announce the Day of Judgment (Yawm al-Qiyāmah). The trumpet is constantly poised at his lips, ready to be blown when God so orders.

The name "Israfil" (or "Israfel", "Esrafil") is not specifically written in the Quran, although there is mention of an unnamed trumpet-angel assumed to identify this figure:

And the trumpet shall be blown, so all those that are in the heavens and all those that are in the earth shall swoon, except him whom Allah will; then it shall be blown again, then they shall stand up awaiting.

— Qur'an (39.68)

Certain Islamic sources indicate that, created at the beginning of time, Israfil possesses four wings, and is so tall as to be able to reach from the earth to the pillars of heaven. A beautiful angel who is a master of music, Israfil sings praises to God in a thousand different languages, the breath of which is used to inject life into hosts of angels who add to the songs themselves. Further he is probably the highest angel, since he also mediates between God and the other archangels, reading on the Preserved Tablet (al-lawh al-mahfooz) to transmit the commands of God. Although disputed, some reports assert he visited Muhammad prior to the archangel Gabriel.

According to Sufi traditions reported by Imam Rafa'il, the Ghawth or Qutb ('perfect human being'), is someone who has a heart that resembles that of the archangel Israfil, signifying the loftiness of this angel. The next in rank are the saints who are known as the Umdah or Awtad, amongst whom the highest ones have their hearts resembling that of archangel Mikhail (archangel Michael), and the rest of the lower ranking saints having the heart of Jibrail (archangel Gabriel), and that of the previous prophets before the Islamic prophet Muhammad. The earth is believed to always have one of the Qutb.

In another account, Rafāʾīl (Arabic: رفائيل) is mentioned by name in the Islamic tradition narrated by Ath-Tha'labi from Ali. He is said to have met Dhu al-Qarnayn who is mentioned in the last part of Surah 18 of the Quran, al-Kahf ("The Cave"). Dhu al-Qarnayn (The Two Horned One) is believed by some to be Alexander The Great.

The angel told Dhu al-Qarnayn about the Water of Life (Ayn al-Hayat). Hearing that there was such a spring, Dhu al-Qarnayn wanted to drink the Water of Life, but the only one who had succeeded in drinking it was his cousin, Khidr. In Islamic tradition, Khidr is the mystical guide popularly quoted especially in Sufi traditions who has attained a long life and appears to selected Islamic saints throughout the times.

== Places named for Raphael ==
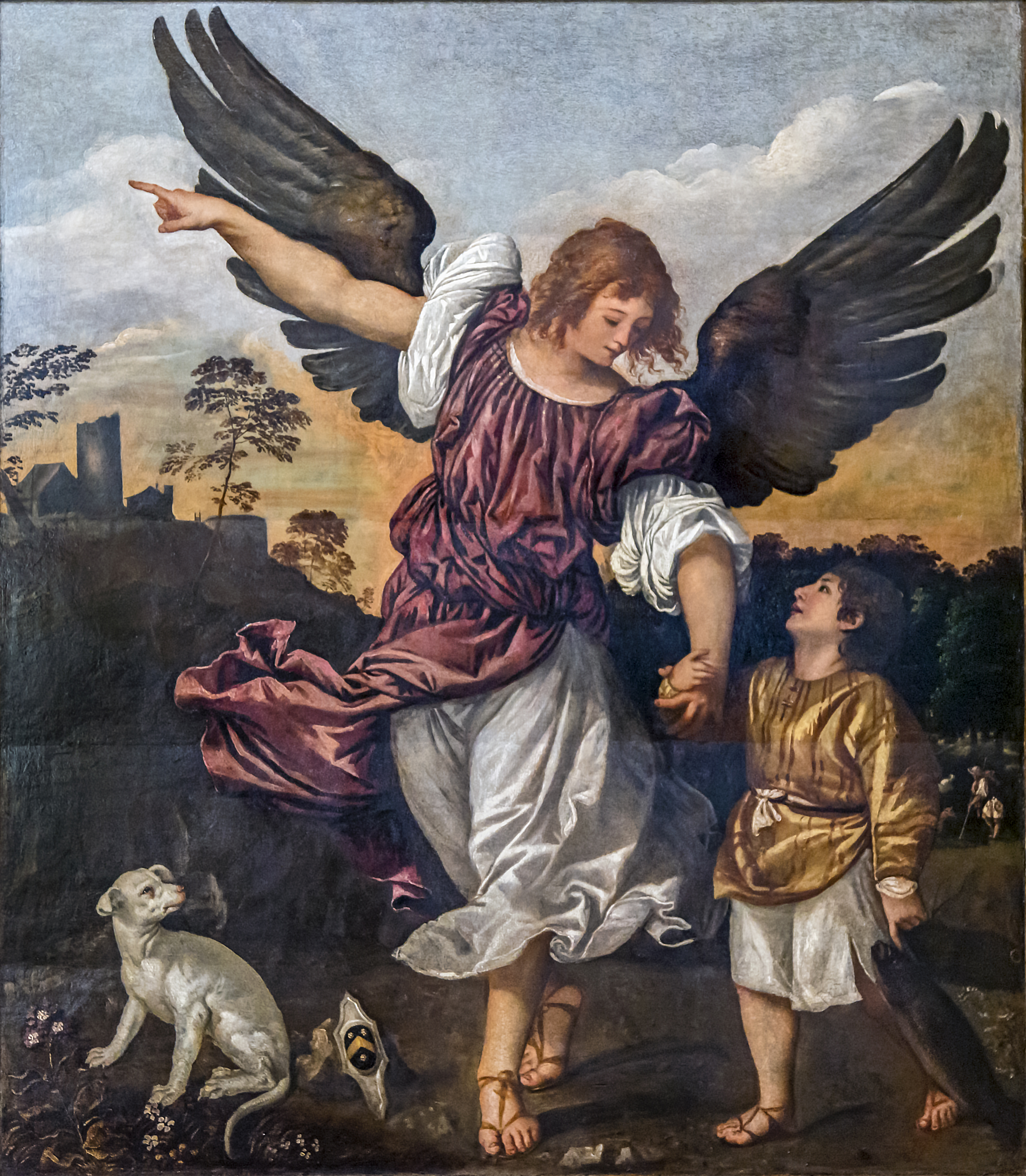
Titian, The Archangel Raphael and Tobias (c. 1512−1514)

The following places have been named in honor of Raphael:

Saint-Raphaël, France; Saint Raphaël, Quebec, Canada; and San Rafaels in Argentina, Bolivia, Colombia, Costa Rica, Chile, Mexico, Trinidad and Tobago, Peru, and the Philippines; also San Rafael de El Moján and San Rafael de Orituco in Venezuela.

- In the United States, patronages under the name San Rafael, inherited from Spanish tradition survive in California (where besides the city there are the San Rafael Mountains) and also:
- Mission San Rafael Arcángel in San Rafael, California.
- New Mexico, and Utah, where the San Rafael River flows seasonally in the San Rafael Desert.

More recent examples include:

- St. Raphael's Cathedral, the seat of the Diocese of Madison, Wisconsin
- St. Raphael's Cathedral, the seat of the Archdiocese of Dubuque
- St. Raphael's Episcopal Church in Crossville, Tennessee, in the Episcopal Diocese of East Tennessee.
- St. Raphael the Archangel Catholic Church and School, Raleigh, North Carolina
- St. Raphael the Archangel Parish, Saint Louis, Missouri
- St. Raphael Hospital New Haven, Connecticut, USA

Elsewhere:

- St. Raphael's Catholic Church, Yeading, Hayes, Middlesex, England
- St. Raphael's Estate, a housing estate in the London Borough of Brent, England
- St. Raphael's Church, Huccaby, Hexworthy, Dartmoor National Park, Devon, England
- San Rafael, Vecindario, Santa Lucia de Tirajana Gran Canaria

The Arcangelo Raffaello youth confraternity functioned in Florence, Italy from its founding in 1411 to its suppression in 1785.

St. John of God Catholic Church in Chicago, Illinois, was disassembled, moved and reassembled as St. Raphael the Archangel Church in Mill Creek, Illinois.

== In popular culture ==
Raphael, along with many other prominent angels, appears in John Milton's Paradise Lost, in which he is assigned by God to re-warn Adam concerning the sin of eating of the tree of the knowledge of good and evil. He also expounds to Adam the War in Heaven in which Lucifer and the demons fell, and the creation of the Earth.

In the Japanese light novel series Date A Live, Raphael is a spiritual weapon (referred to as angels within the series), belonging to Kaguya Yamai and Yuzuru Yamai. Raphael takes the form of a lance and a pendulum, becoming a bow and arrow when combined. It has the ability to manipulate wind.

In Joseph Haydn's Creation, Raphael (bass) is one of the three angelic narrators, along with Gabriel (soprano) and Uriel (tenor).

Raphael features as one of the four archangels in the TV series Supernatural.

In season 2 of the TV series Criminal Minds, the archangel Raphael is brought up as being one of Tobias Hankel's personalities.

In the Yogscast YouTube series Shadow of Israphel, the main antagonist and titular character derives his namesake from that of St. Raphael.

Raphael, one of the Teenage Mutant Ninja Turtles, is named after the renaissance artist Raffaello Sanzio da Urbino who himself was named after the archangel.

== Gallery ==
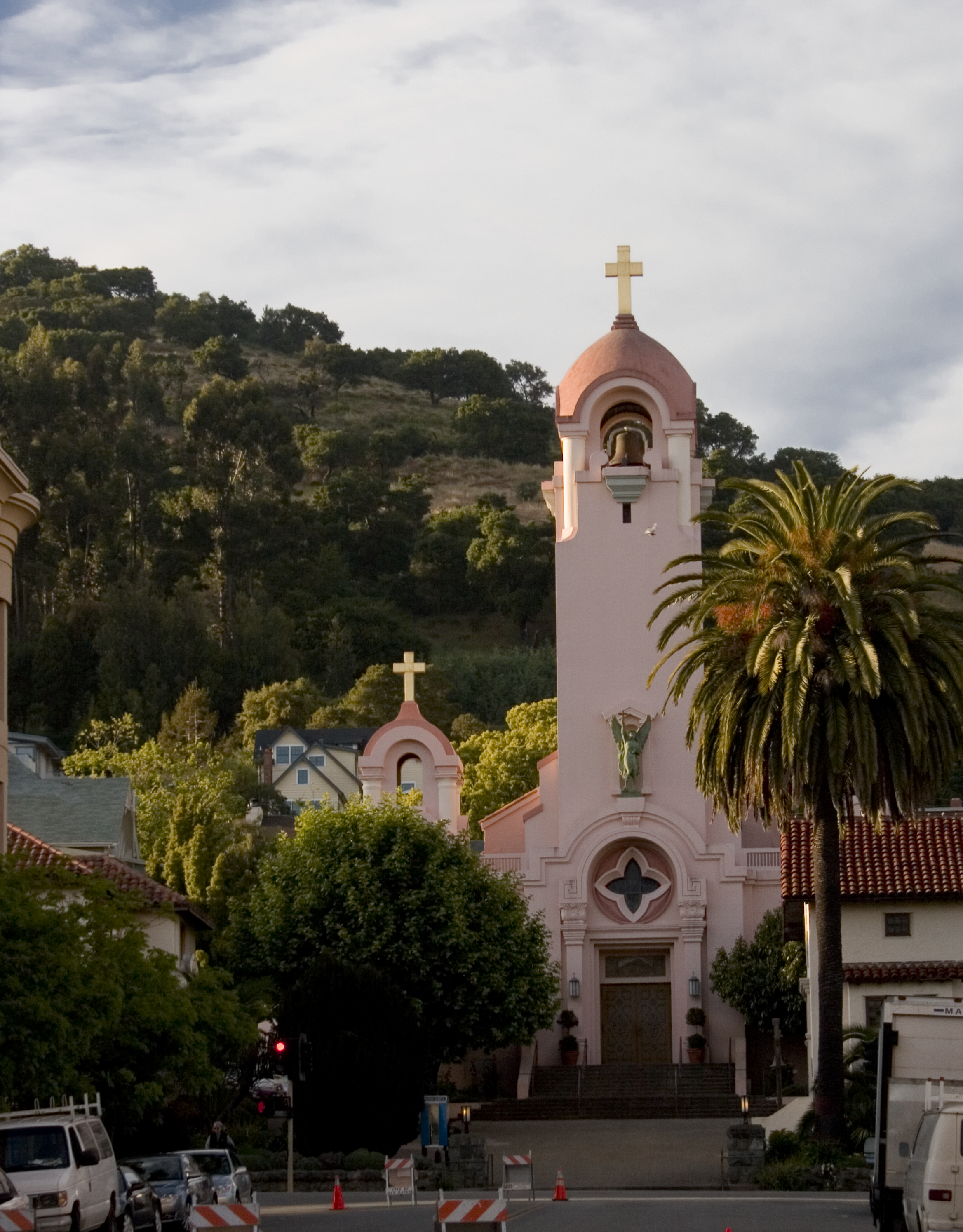

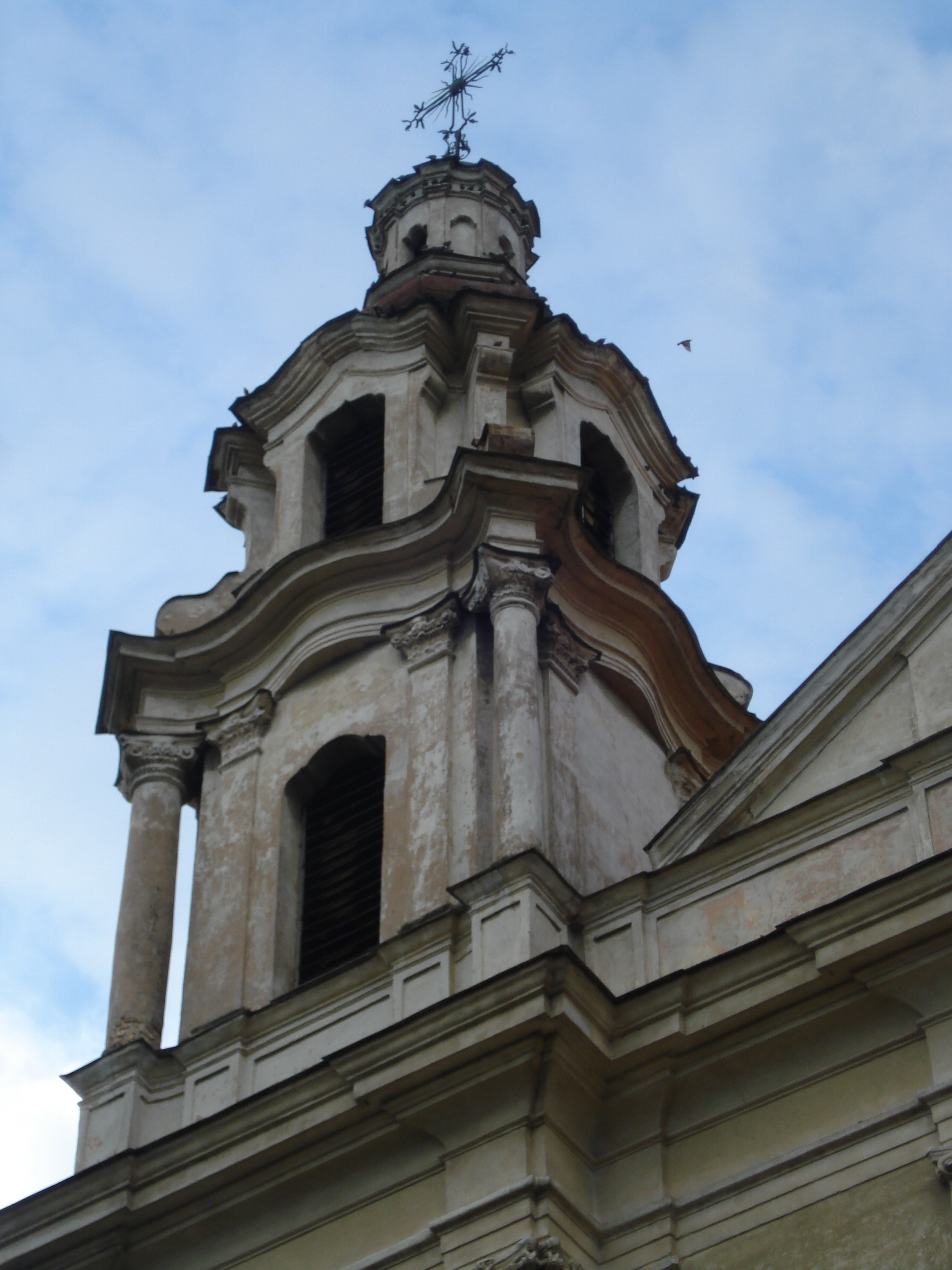

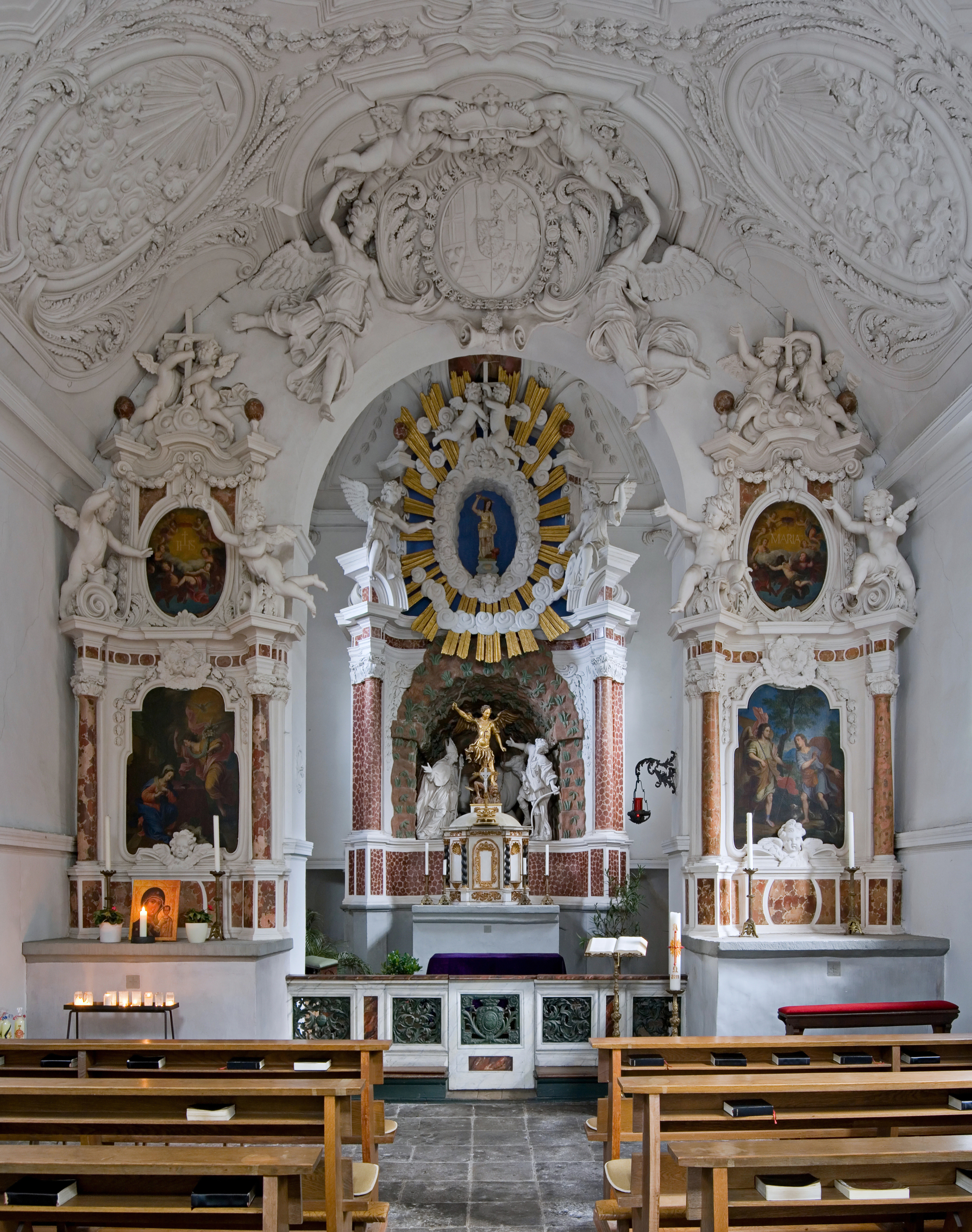

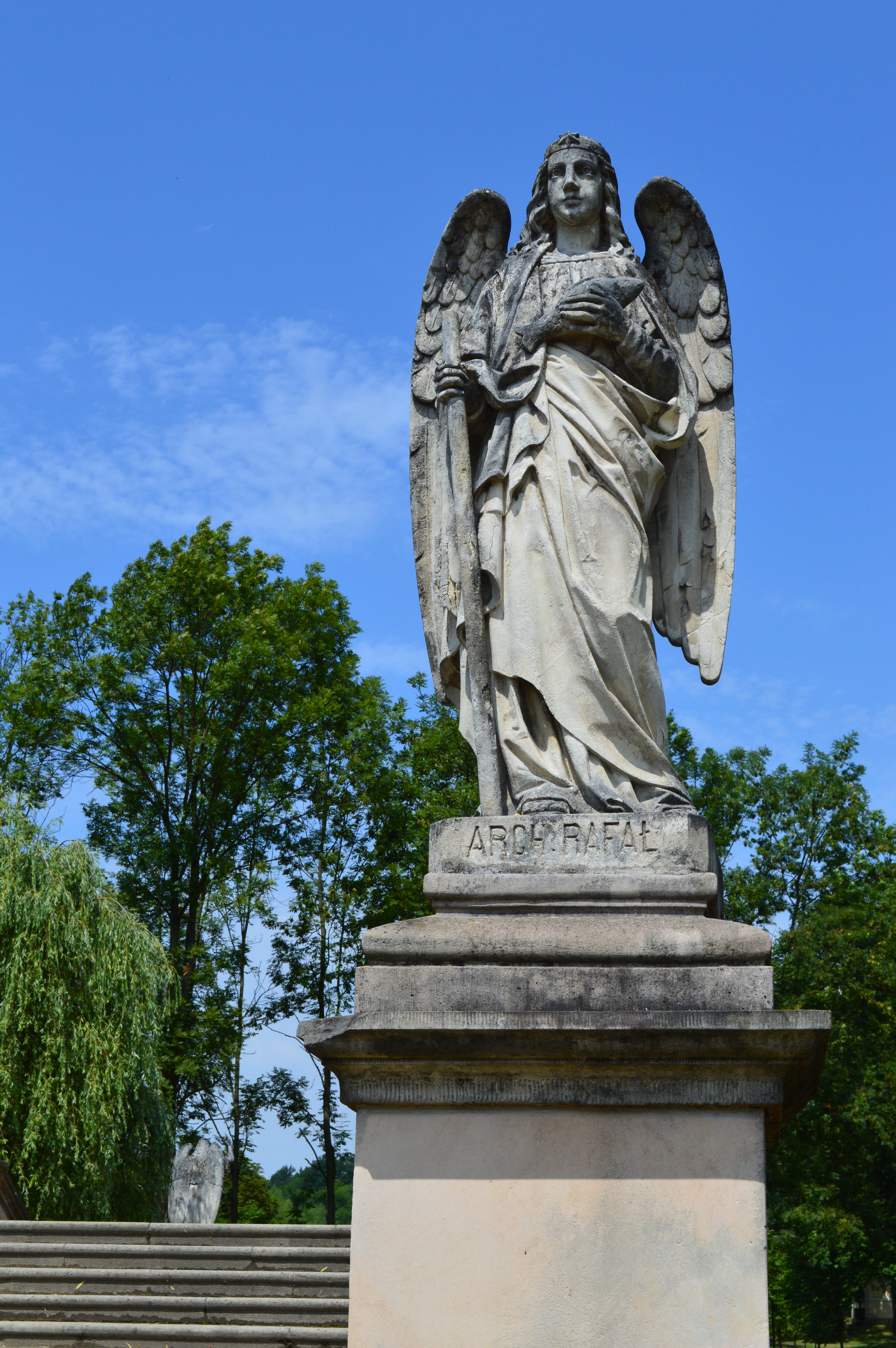

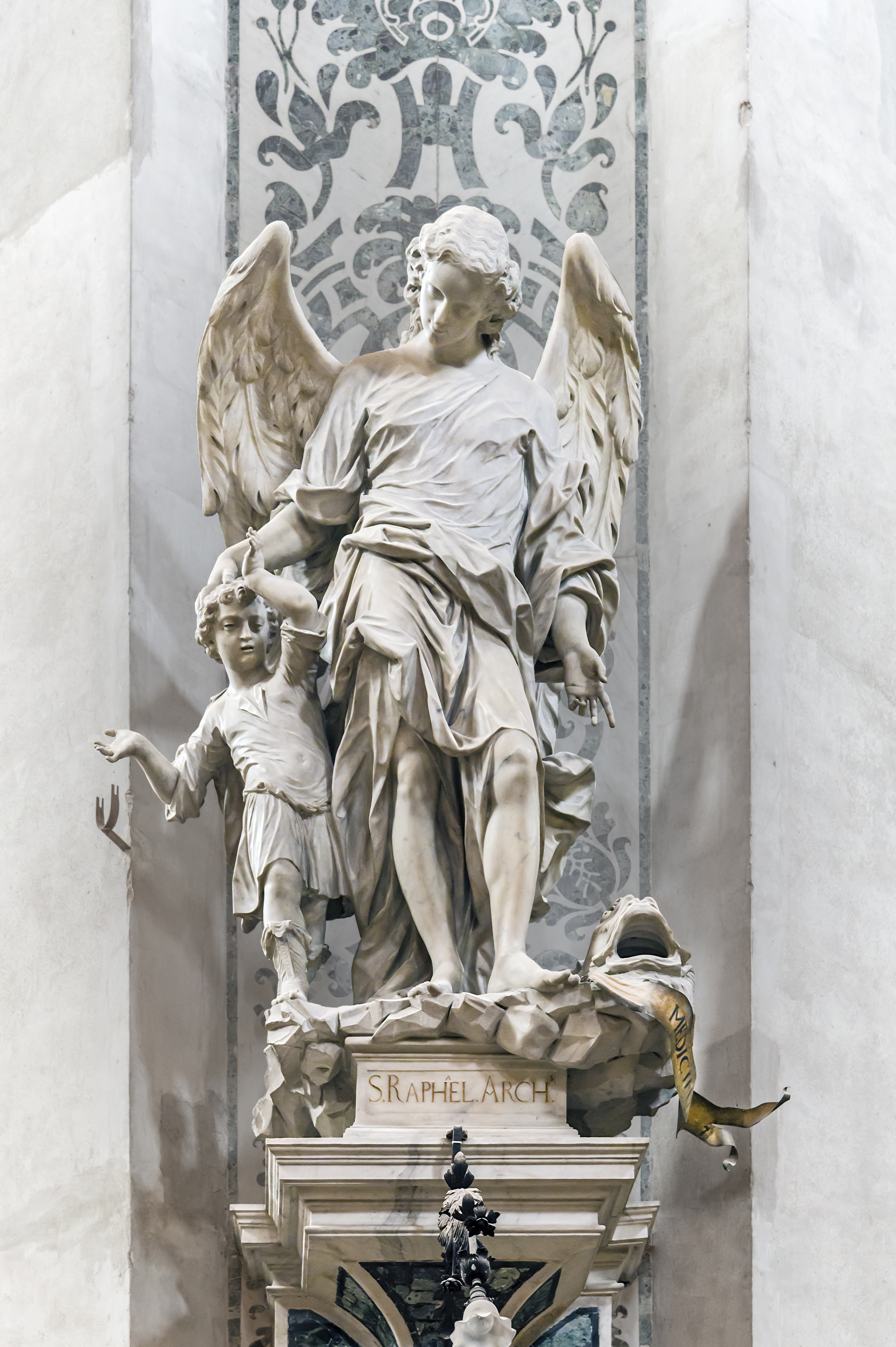

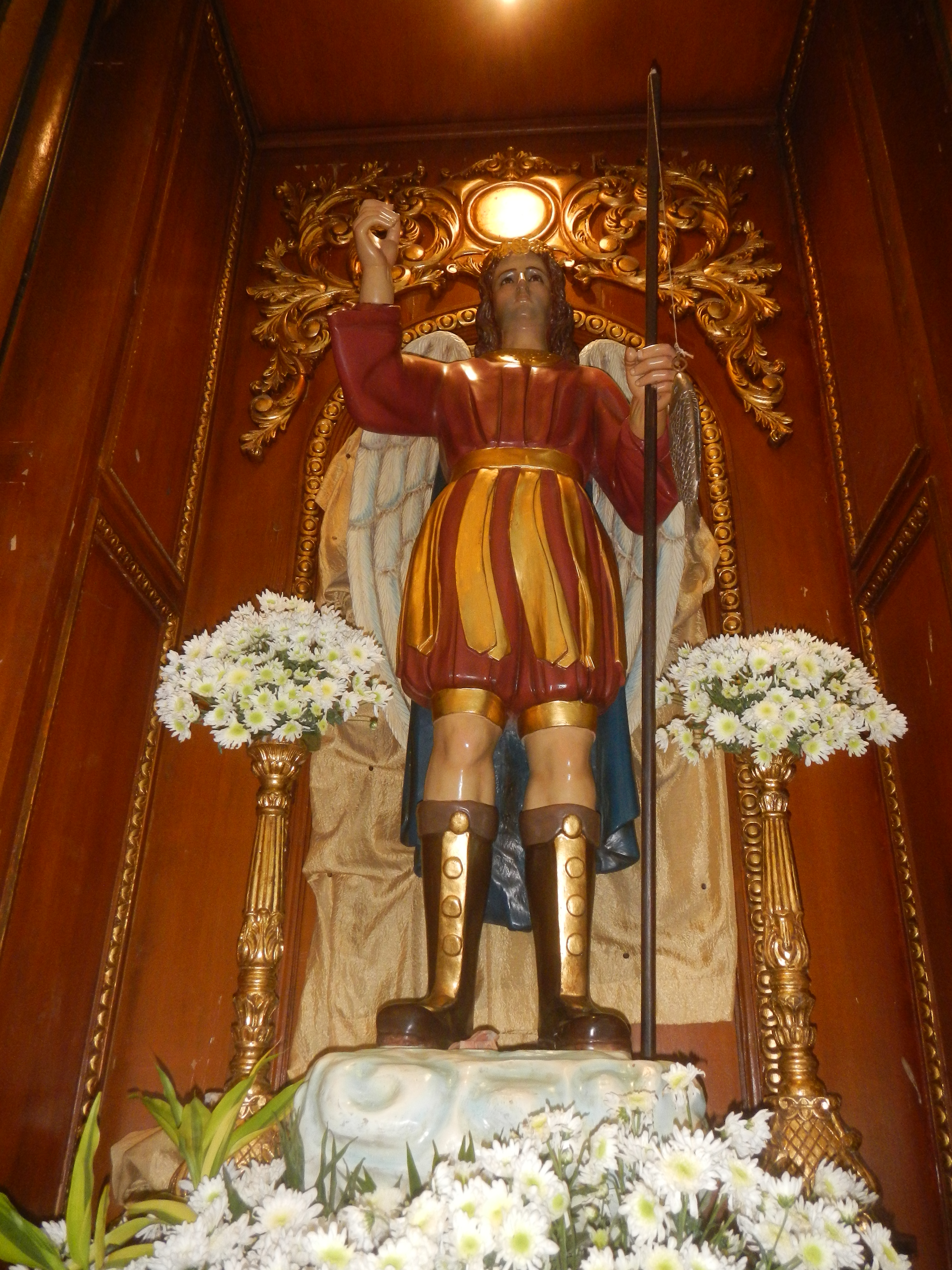

== See also ==
- List of angels in theology
- Angels in Judaism
- Feast of Saint Raphael, Ollur
- Saint Raphael, patron saint archive

== Bibliography ==
- Angels in Art by Clara Erskine Clement Waters
- Barker, Margaret (2006). "The Angel Raphael in the Book of Tobit". In Bredin, Mark (ed.). Studies in the Book of Tobit. A&C Black. ISBN 9780567082299.
- Barnes, William H. (1993). "Archangels". In Coogan, Michael David; Metzger, Bruce M. (eds.). The Oxford Companion to the Bible. Oxford University Press. ISBN 9780199743919.
- Coogan, Michael D. (1993). "Raphael". In Coogan, Michael David; Metzger, Bruce M. (eds.). The Oxford Companion to the Bible. Oxford University Press. ISBN 9780199743919.
- Cresswell, Julia (2011). "Archangels". In Cresswell, Julia (ed.). The Watkins Dictionary of Angels. Duncan Baird Publishers. ISBN 9781780283609.
- Esler, Philip Francis (2017). God's Court and Courtiers in the Book of the Watchers. Wipf and Stock Publishers. ISBN 9781625649089.
- Grabbe, Lester (2003). "Tobit". In Dunn, James D. G. (ed.). Eerdmans Commentary on the Bible. Eerdmans. ISBN 9780802837110.
- Grossman, Maxine L. (2011). "Angels". In Grossman, Maxine L. (ed.). The Oxford Dictionary of the Jewish Religion. Oxford University Press. ISBN 9780199730049.
- Mach, M. (1999). "Raphael". In Van der Toorn, Karel; Becking, Bob; Van der Horst, Pieter Willem (eds.). Dictionary of Deities and Demons in the Bible. Eerdmans. ISBN 9780802824912.
- Meier, S.A. (1999). "Angel I". In Van der Toorn, Karel; Becking, Bob; Van der Horst, Pieter Willem (eds.). Dictionary of Deities and Demons in the Bible. Eerdmans. ISBN 9780802824912.
- Schaller, Berndt (1999). "Enoch". In Bromiley, Geoffrey William (ed.). The Encyclopedia of Christianity. Vol. 2. Eerdmans. ISBN 9789004116955.
- Soll, Will (2000). "Raphael". In Freedman, David Noel; Myers, Allen C. (eds.). Eerdmans Dictionary of the Bible. Eerdmans. ISBN 9789053565032.
- Van Henten, J.W. (1999). "Archangel". In Van der Toorn, Karel; Becking, Bob; Van der Horst, Pieter Willem (eds.). Dictionary of Deities and Demons in the Bible. Eerdmans. ISBN 9780802824912.
