= The Archangel Raphael and Tobias (Titian) =

Painting by Titian

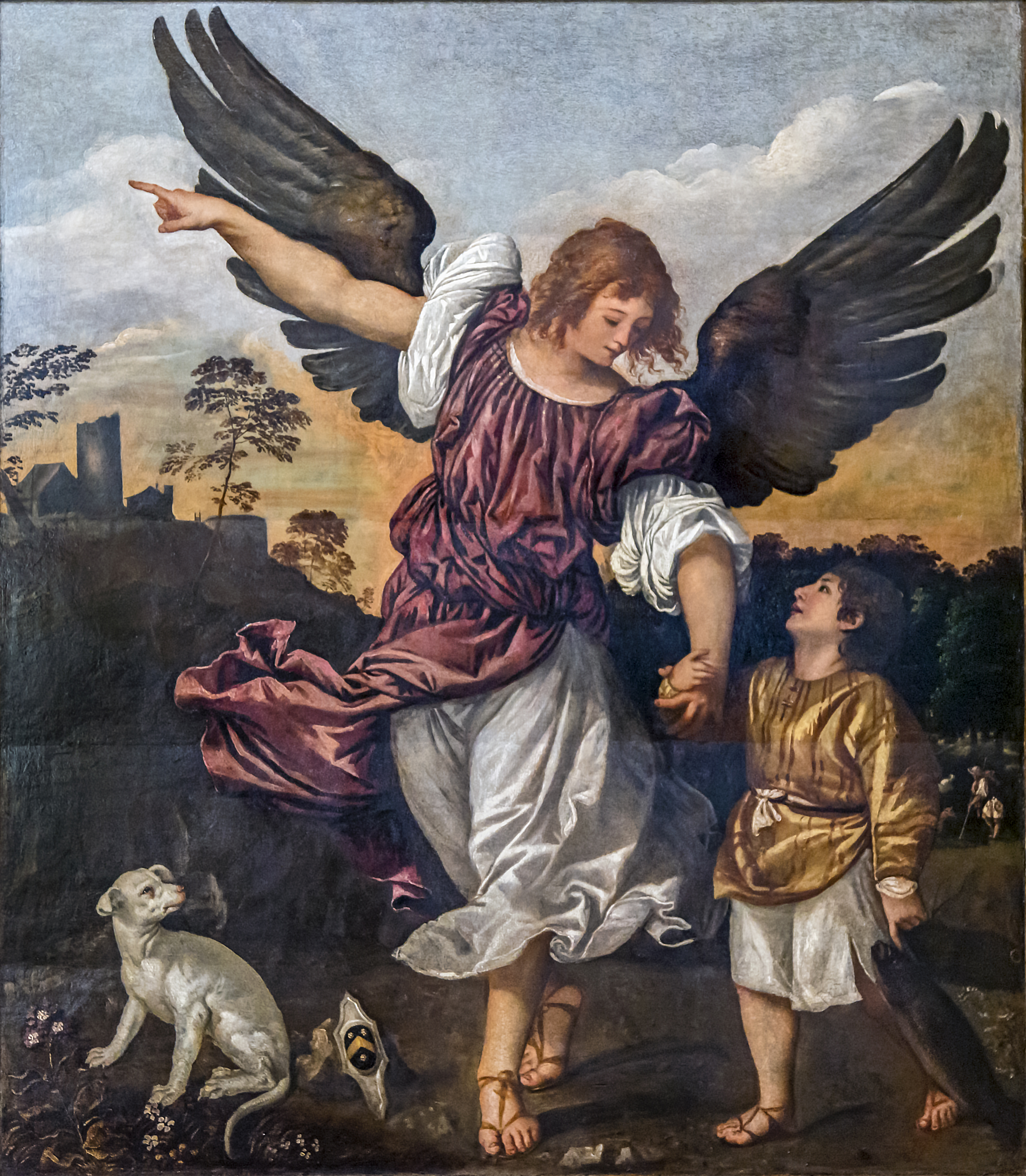
- Year: c. 1512−1514
- Catalogue: 1325
- Medium: Oil on panel
- Dimensions: 170 cm × 146 cm (67 in × 57 in)
- Location: Gallerie dell'Accademia, Venice

The Archangel Raphael and Tobias (Italian: Arcangelo Raffaele e Tobiolo) is an oil painting by Titian of Tobias and the Angel, dated to about 1512 to 1514, which is now in the Gallerie dell'Accademia in Venice. Another painting by Titian of the same subject, entitled Tobias and the Angel (Tobiolo e l'angelo), dated to about 1540 to 1545, remains in the church of the Madonna dell'Orto in Venice.

== The Archangel Raphael and Tobias ==
This early, Giorgionesque work of Tobias and the Angel is recorded in a print by Lefèbre. The painting comes from the church of Santa Caterina, Venice, and was formerly thought by some scholars to be a copy of a lost original.

The picture is attested—starting from Boschini, writing in 1664—on an altar dedicated to the Archangel Raphael on the right side of the church. The presence of the Bembo coat of arms suggests that the painting was commissioned by a member of the family of the Renaissance humanist scholar Pietro Bembo.

== Tobias and the Angel ==
Tobias and the Angel
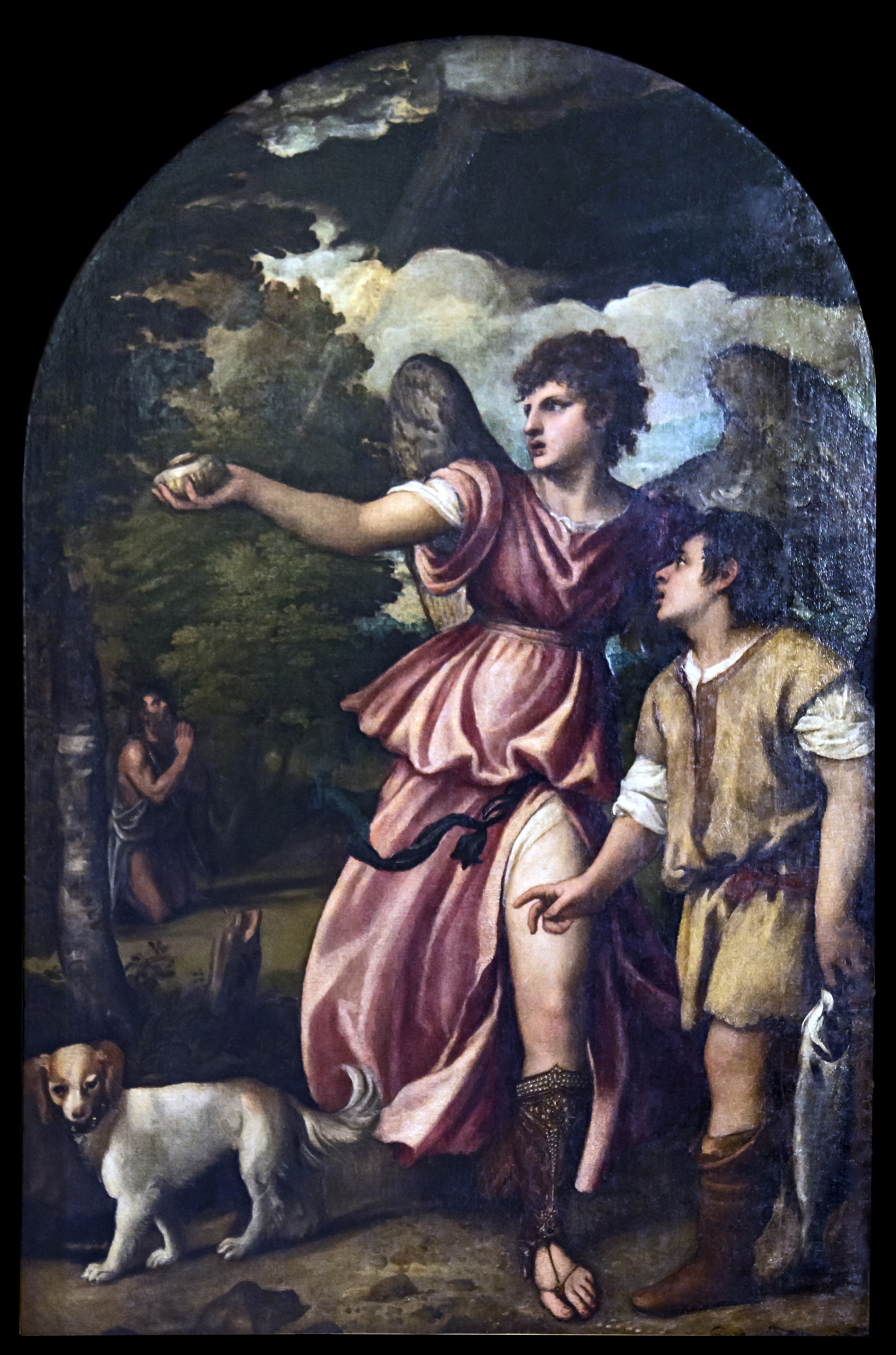
- Year: c. 1540−1545
- Medium: Oil on canvas
- Dimensions: 200 cm × 140 cm (79 in × 55 in)
- Location: Madonna dell'Orto, Venice

=== History ===
Vasari relates that Titian painted it in 1507, "at the time of the war of the Emperor Maximilian, as he himself tells". Giovanni Morelli also considered this version an early work. But the style contradicts this view, and therefore the picture is put down by Crowe and Cavalcaselle to the same time as the Presentation of the Virgin. Gronau and Ricketts think that it was done a short time later, in the early 1540s.

=== Description ===
In Tobias and the Archangel, the two figures are both put into the right half of the picture. They have advanced quite to the front walking briskly; their attention is directed to the vase which Raphael carries—the boy's eye is fixed intently upon it. As he steps along, the left leg of the Archangel is bared, his right arm is stretched out from his body, the left, which is not visible, seems to be placed round Tobias to protect him. A little dog runs in front and leads the way. The left half of the picture is filled by the entrance to a wood, in the shadow of which a kneeling man’s figure (perhaps John the Baptist) is to be seen. This dark mass of trees serves to bring out the two figures strongly to the front.

=== Analysis ===
According to Georg Gronau, the Annunciation and Tobias and the Archangel exhibit similar artistic tendencies, especially in colour, to the Presentation of Mary in the Temple. Ricketts is critical the first two pictures mentioned: "Both are sadly darkened owing to neglect—neither is quite worthy of Titian—both suggest an earlier type of design executed at a period when the painter's technique had changed and become unsuited to the character of the composition." Gronau thinks the little dog in the Tobias "very badly painted if we think of the great animal painters of the succeeding century".

== Gallery ==
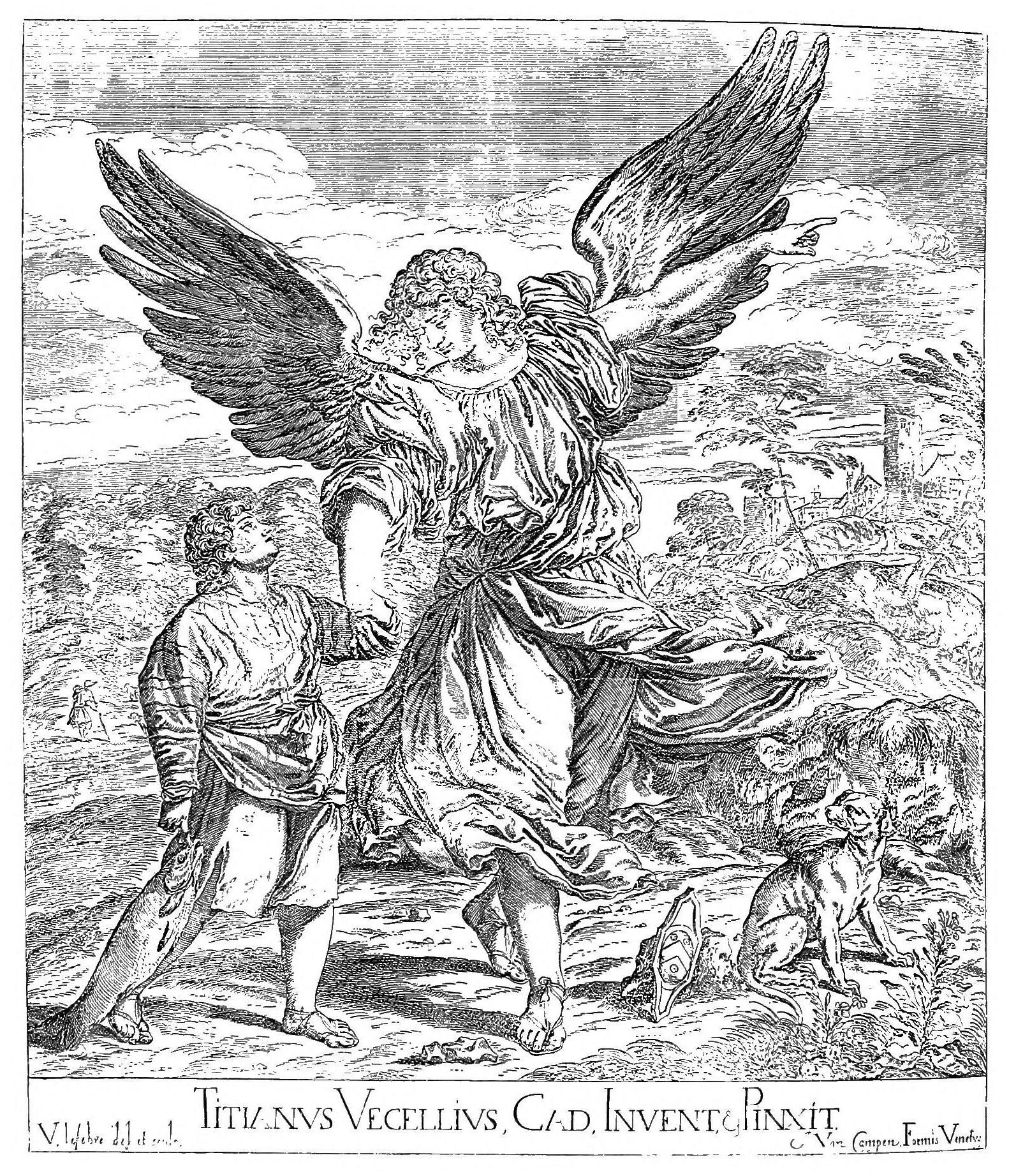
Lefèbre's print after the first version, 1684

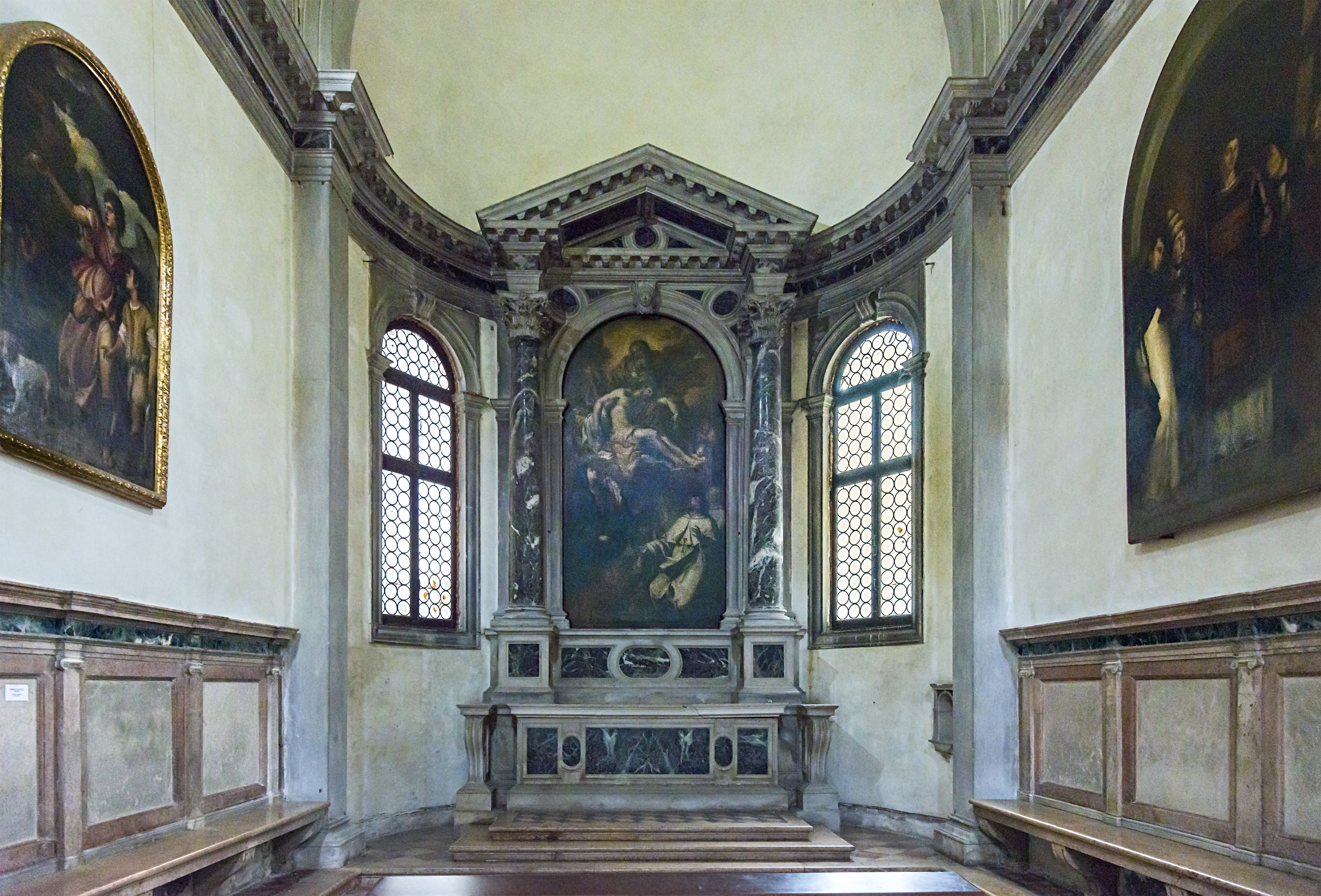
Titian's second version (left) in situ

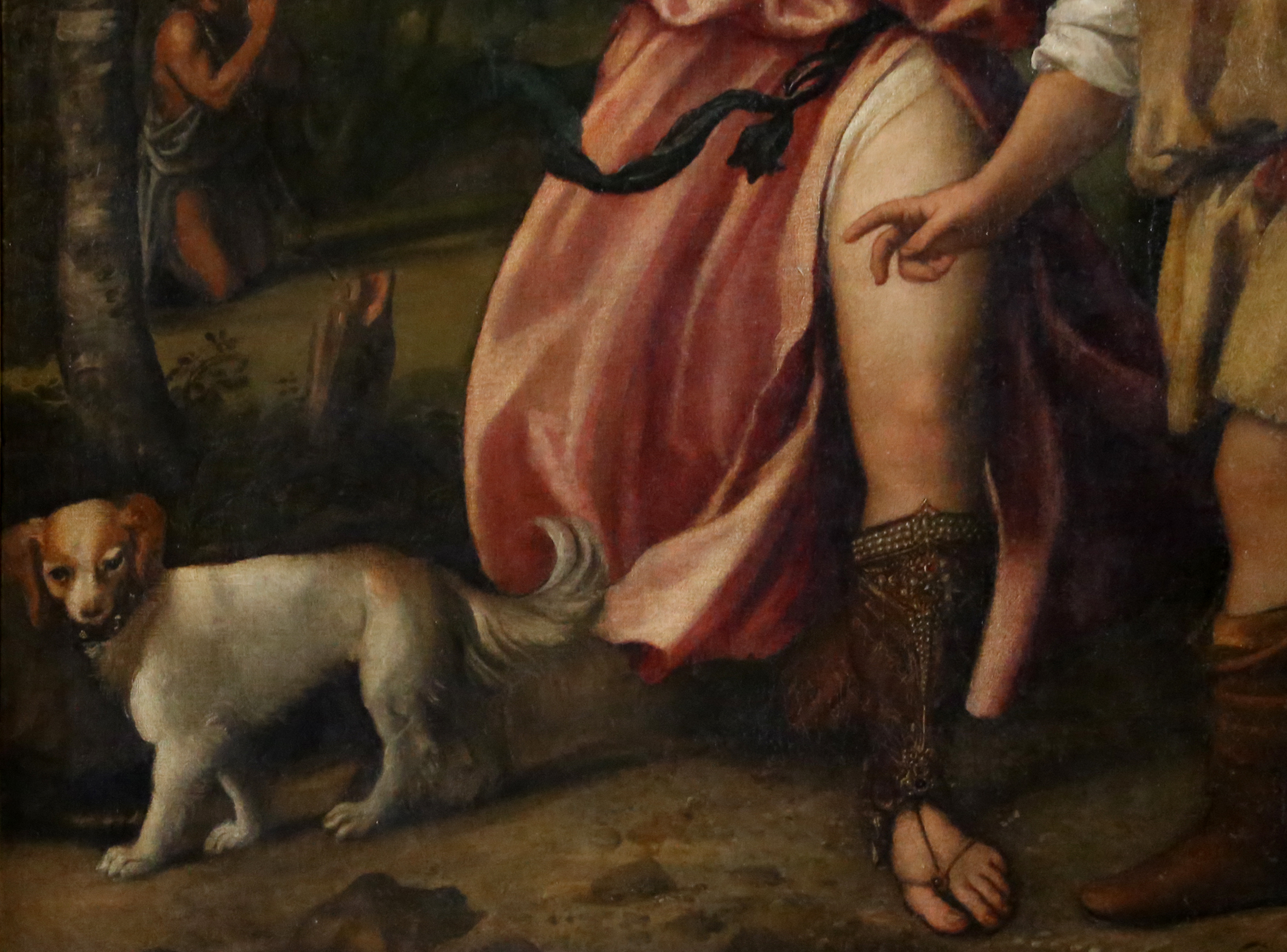
Titian's second version (detail with little dog)

== See also ==
- List of works by Titian

== Sources ==
- "L'Arcangelo Raffaele E Tobiolo". Gallerie Accademia, Venezia. Retrieved 17 October 2022.

Attribution:
