= Israfil =

Archangel in Islam

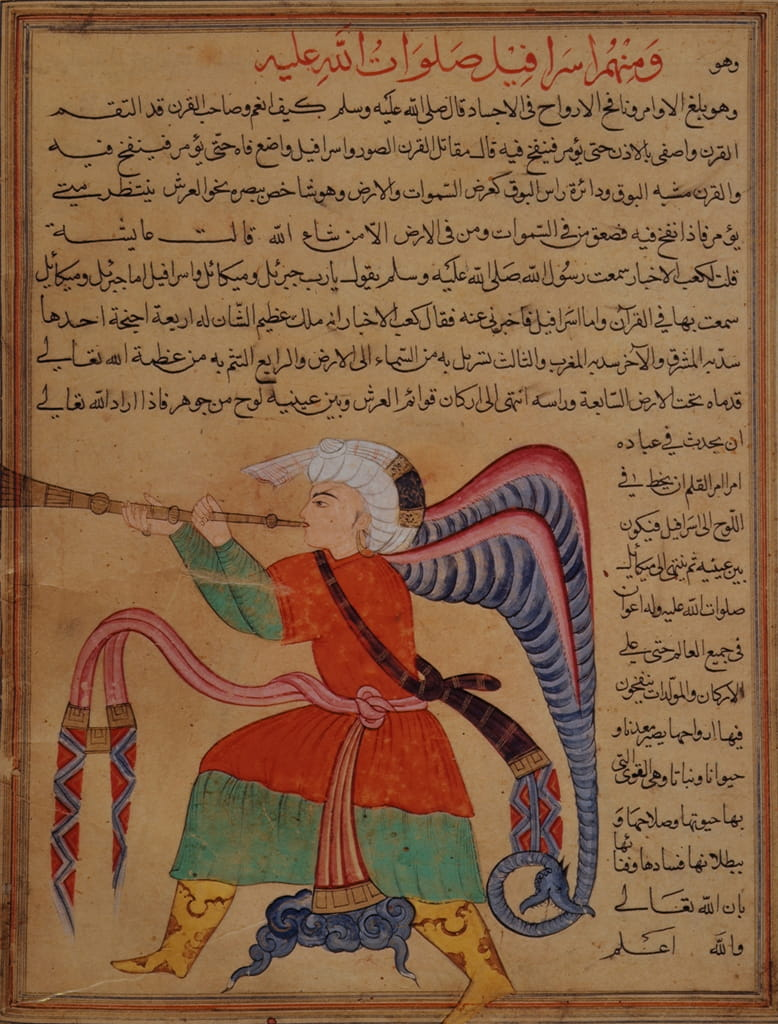
Israfel blows a nafir in Zakariya al-Qazwini's The Wonders of Creation (1570s).

Israfil (Arabic: إِسْرَافِيْل, ʾIsrāfīl) or Israfel is the angel who will blow the trumpet to signal Qiyamah (the Day of Judgment) in Islam. Though unnamed in the Quran, he is one of the four archangels in Islamic tradition, along with Michael, Gabriel, and Azrael. The "Book of Dead" described Israfil as the oldest of all archangels. He is commonly thought of as the counterpart of the Judeo-Christian archangel Raphael.

Israfil is portrayed as writing the destiny of humans and all commands of God to the (other) archangels with the pen (qalam), which he carries with one wing; with the other wing, Israfil covers his face, unable to look at God.

== In religious tradition ==
Israfil is mentioned in a hadith as the angel nearest to God, mediating the commands of God to the other archangels. Although the name Israfil does not appear in the Quran, a figure blowing a trumpet is repeatedly alluded to, and is assumed to be this figure:

And the trumpet shall be blown, so all those that are in the heavens and all those that are in the earth shall swoon, except him whom Allah will ; then it shall be blown again, then they shall stand up awaiting.

— Quran 39:68

Kitab Aḥwāl al-Qiyāma, states:

Know that Israfil is the master of the horn [al-qarn]. God created the preserved tablet [al-lawḥ al-maḥfuz] of white pearl. Its length is seven times the distance between the heaven and the earth and it is connected to the Throne. All that exists until the day of resurrection is written on it. Israfil has four wings--one in the East, one in the West, one covering his legs and one shielding his head and face in fear of God. His head is inclined toward the Throne .... No angel is nearer to the throne than Israfil. Seven veils are between him and the Throne, each veil five hundred years distance from the next; seventy veils are between Jibril and Israfil. While he is standing the trumpet [ṣur] is placed on his right · thigh and the head of the trumpet on his mouth. He awaits the command of God, and when God commands he will blow. And when the period of the world is completed, the trumpet will be brought near the face of Israfil and he will fold his four wings and blow the trumpet.

Due to his beautiful voice, he is also the Muaddhin of those in Heaven.

Kitab Aḥwāl al-Qiyāma states he has four wings, however, another tradition mentions that he has twelve.

Israfil is also said to have been sent along with the other three Islamic archangels to collect dust from the four corners of the earth, though only Angel of Death succeeded in this mission. It was from this dust that Adam, the first man and Prophet, was formed.

Israfil has been thought as the angels of Christian tradition, including Uriel and Raphael.

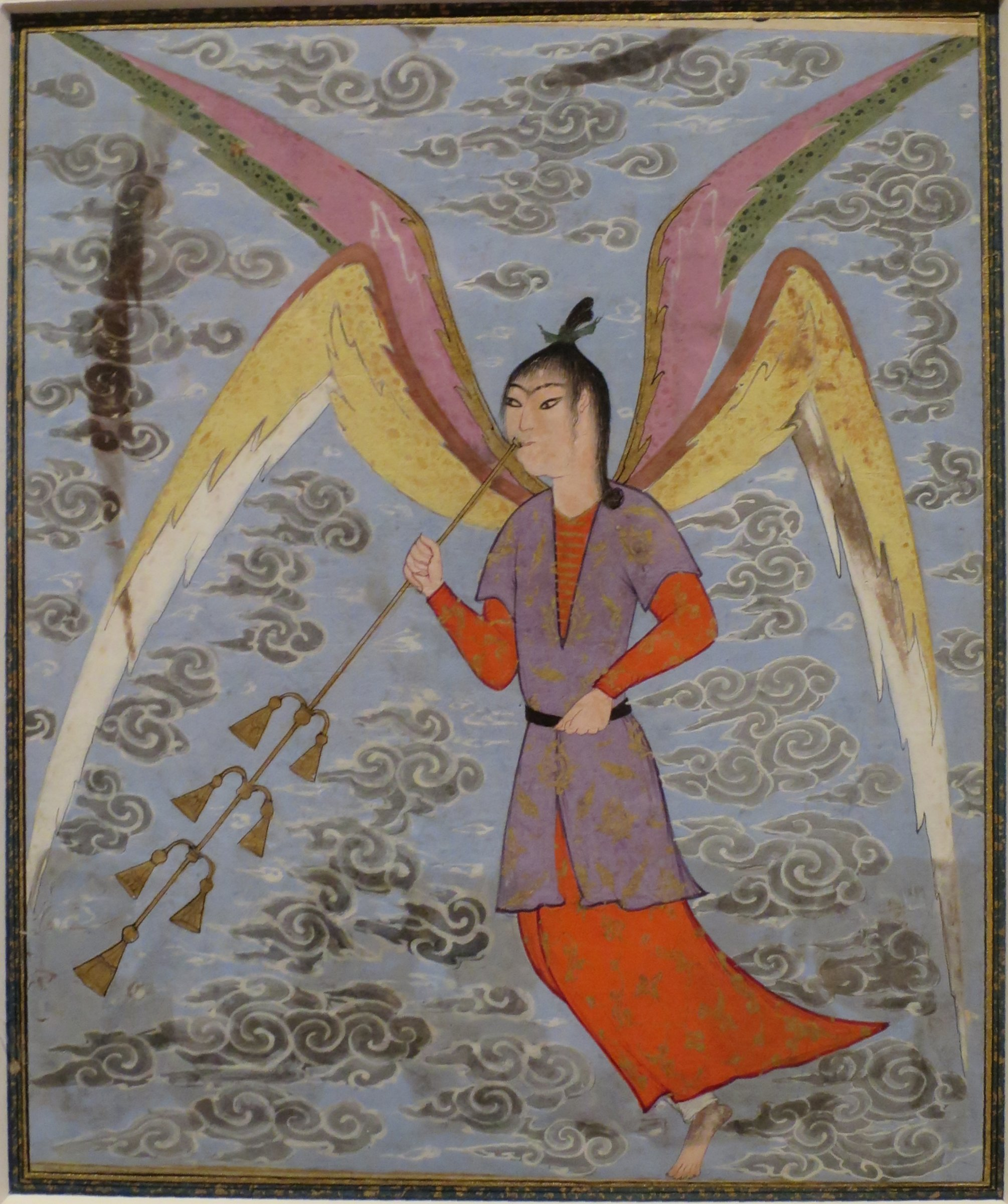
Angel not named in source for image; matches other images that name the angel Israfel

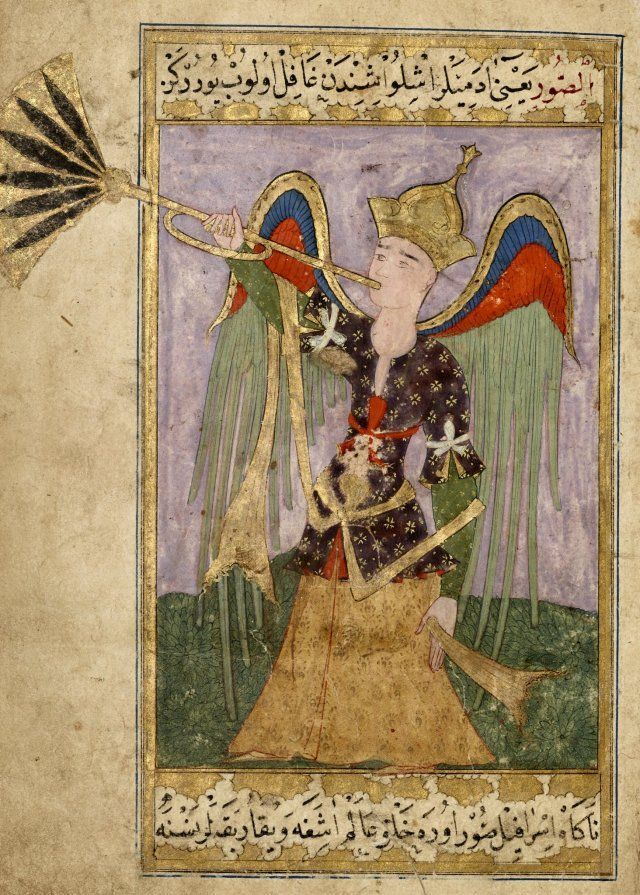
Israfil, the Angel of Resurrection, Blows the Seven-Fold Trumpet, Ottoman miniature

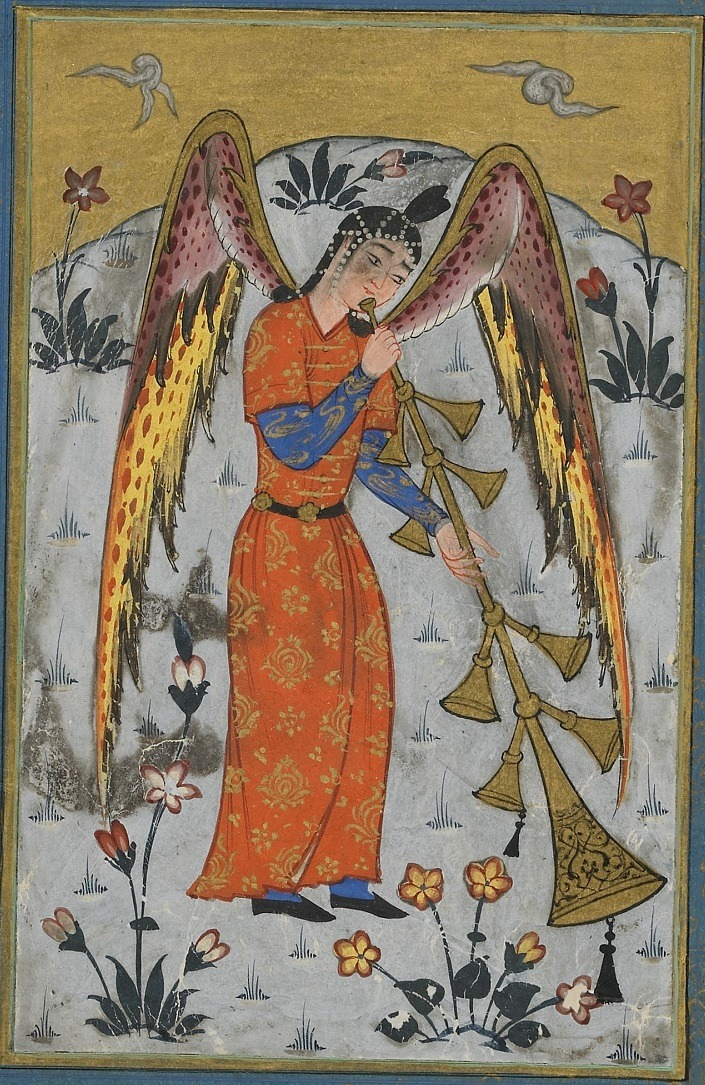
Israfel blows the trumpet

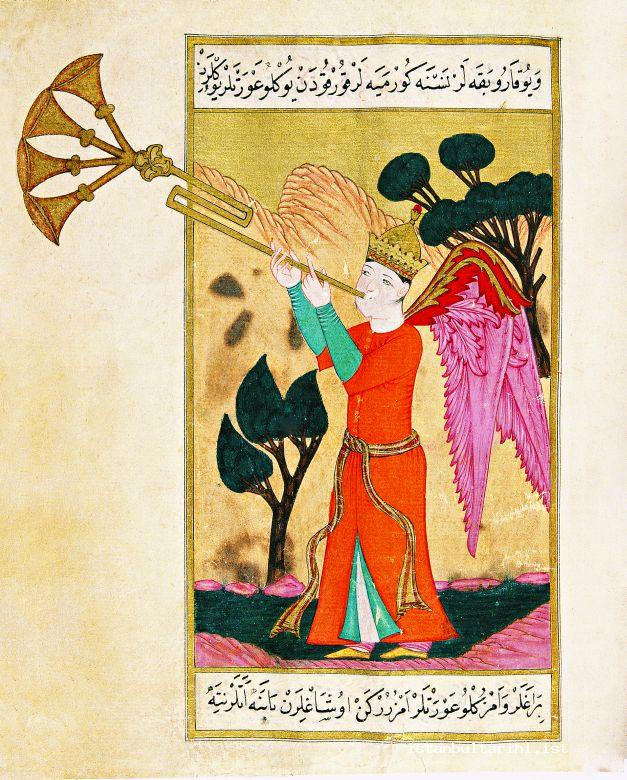
Israfel blows the trumpet of Sur

== See also ==
- Angels in Islam
- List of angels in theology
- Eschatology
- Judgement (tarot card)
- Resurrection
- Seraph
- Seraphiel
- Seven trumpets

== Bibliography ==
- Abasoomar, Moulana Muhammad; Abasoomar, Moulana Haroon (2016). "Virtue of Sayyiduna Zubayr (radiyallahu 'anhu)". Hadith Answers. Darul Hadith.
- Bin Al-Hassan, Abi Al-Qasim Ali; Al-Dimashqi, Ibn Asaker (2012). تاريخ مدينة دمشق 1-37 ج10 [History of the city of Damascus]. Dar Al Kotob Al Ilmiyah دار الكتب العلمية.
- Rizqullah, Ahmad Mahdi (2005). A Biography of the Prophet of Islam In the Light of the Original Sources, an Analytical Study · Volume 1. Darussalam Publishers. p. 410. ISBN 9789960969022.
- Campo, Juan E. (2009). Encyclopedia of Islam. New York, NY: Facts On File. p. 750. ISBN 978-1438126968.
- Oliver, Evelyn Dorothy; Lewis, James R. (2008). Angels A to Z (2nd ed.). Canton, MI: Visible Ink Press. p. 202. ISBN 9781578592128.
- Schwebel, Rosemary Ellen Guiley; foreword by Lisa (2004). The encyclopedia of angels (2nd ed.). New York: Facts on File. p. 193. ISBN 9781438130026.
- Webster, Richard (2009). Encyclopedia of angels (1st ed.). Woodbury, Minn.: Llewellyn Publications. p. 97. ISBN 9780738714622.
- Student's Britannica: India. New Delhi: Encyclopædia Britannica (India). 2000. p. 92. ISBN 9780852297605.
