= Nuriel =

Angel in Judaism

Nuriel (Hebrew: נוּרִיאֵל Nūrīʾēl; meaning: "El/God is my fire" or "El/God is my light") is an angel in Judaism who is responsible for hailstorms. He is the archangel Uriel, whose name changes when inclined towards judgment.

In Jewish legend, Moses encountered Nuriel in the 2nd heaven. It is said in the Zohar that when a person opens his lips during the weekdays at Arvit (the evening prayer), an eagle descends to carry the prayer of the night upon its wings. (This eagle is called) Nuriel. He is called Uriel from the aspect of Chesed and Nuriel from the aspect of Gevurah, which is a burning fire about which it is written: "A fiery stream issued and came forth" (Daniel 7:10).

According to the Zohar, Nuriel governs Virgo. He is 300 parasangs (approx. 5.6 km) tall and has an army of 50 myriads of angels (= 500,000) "all fashioned out of water and fire." The height of Nuriel is exceeded only by the Erelim, by the watchers, by Af and Hemah, and of course by Metatron, who is the tallest hierarch in heaven. Nuriel is also effective as a charm for warding off evil. His name is found engraved on oriental and Hebrew amulets, notably those worn by pregnant women.

Outside of Judaism, in the Syriac Book of Protection, Nuriel is characterized as a "spellbinding power" and is grouped with Michael, Shamsiel, Seraphiel, and other great angels. In gnostic lore, Nuriel is one of seven subordinates to Jehuel, prince of fire.

== See also ==
- List of angels in theology
