= Seraphiel =

Angel in the Book of Enoch

Seraphiel (Hebrew: שׂרפיאל, meaning "Seraph of God/El") is the name of an angel in the apocryphal Book of Enoch.

Protector of Metatron, Seraphiel holds the highest rank of the Seraphim with the following directly below him, Jehoel. In some texts, he is referred to as the Angel of Silence. Eponymously named as chief of the Seraphim, one of several for whom this office is claimed, Seraphiel is one of eight judge angels and a prince of the Merkabah. In 3 Enoch, Seraphiel is described as an enormous, brilliant angel as tall as the seven heavens with a face like the face of angels and a body like the body of eagles. He is beautiful, like lightning and the light of the morning star. As chief of the seraphim, he is committed to their care and teaches them songs to sing for the glorification of God. In magical lore, Seraphiel is one of the rulers of Tuesday and also the planet Mercury. He is invoked from the North.

Israfil may be his counterpart in Islam, one of the Archangels.

== See also ==
- List of angels in theology
