= The Presentation of the Virgin at the Temple (Titian) =

Painting by Titian

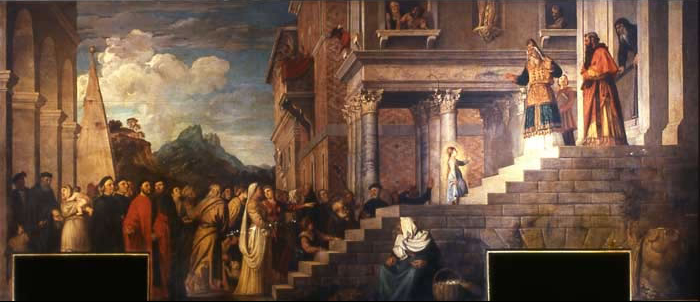
The Presentation of the Virgin at the Temple (1534-1538) by Titian

The Presentation of the Virgin at the Temple is a 1534–1538 painting by Titian. It depicts the three year-old Virgin Mary entering the Temple of Jerusalem. It was commissioned by the fraternity based in the Scuola Grande di Santa Maria della Carita, a building later incorporated into the Gallerie dell'Accademia, in Venice, where the work now hangs.

Between 2010 and 2012, the non-profit organization Save Venice Inc. funded the conservation treatment of the painting. It was removed from the wall and taken to the Misericordia restoration lab in Venice. The restoration took two years and the work was done by conservators Giulio Bono and Erika Bianchini. In 2013, the project was named an Italian Heritage Award Winner of the International Prize for the Valorization of Italian Cultural Heritage, specifically awarded the First Prize for Painting Restoration.

== See also ==
- List of works by Titian

== Bibliography ==
- Cecilia Gibellini, Tiziano, Milan, Rizzoli, coll. « I Classici dell'arte », 2003.
- Francesco Valcanover, L’opera completa di Tiziano, Milan, Rizzoli, 1969.
- Stefano Zuffi, Tiziano, Milan, Mondadori Arte, 2008 ISBN 978-88-370-6436-5
- Marion Kaminski, Tiziano, Cologne, Könemann, 2000 ISBN 3-8290-4553-0
- Sheila Hale, Titian: His Life, HarperCollins, 2012, pp. 392–395 ISBN 978-0-06-059876-1
