= List of artworks on stamps of the United States =

This article lists people whose artwork has been featured on stamps of the United States. For this purpose "featured" is not limited to complete works but includes any identifiable representation of their works. Thus the "Geophysical Year" stamp of 1958 is considered to feature the work of Michelangelo because it shows two hands from his The Creation of Adam. The "issue year" refers to the year when that person's work listed appeared on a stamp of the United States. Many artists have had the same work appear on different U.S. postages stamps and many artists have had multiple works appear on U.S. postage stamps.

The list does not include artists who were commissioned by the U.S. Post Office Department (or its successor, the United States Postal Service) to specifically create artwork for a postage stamp. Scenes from American history, famous Americans, and traditional Christmas images are postage stamp themes frequently employing original artwork.

The main references for the list are: National Postal Museum online database "Arago: Philately", the Colnect Worldwide Stamp Catalog, and the US Stamp Gallery.

Scott Number	Issue Year	Series/Issues	Stamp	Artwork Title	Artist	Artwork Location
64	1861	1861 Issues		George Washington bust	Jean-Antoine Houdon	
68	1861	1861 Issues		George Washington portrait	Gilbert Stuart	
69	1861	1861 Issues		George Washington portrait	Gilbert Stuart	
119	1869	Pictorial Issues		The Landing of Columbus	John Vanderlyn	
120	1869	Pictorial Issues		The Declaration of Independence	John Trumbull	
147	1870	Large Bank Note Issues		George Washington bust	Jean-Antoine Houdon	
148	1870	Large Bank Note Issues		Abraham Lincoln bust	Thomas Dow Jones	
150	1870	Large Bank Note Issues		Thomas Jefferson bust	Hiram Powers	
230	1893	Columbian Exposition Issues		Columbus in Sight of Land	William Henry Powell	
231	1893	Columbian Exposition Issues		The Landing of Columbus	John Vanderlyn	
232	1893	Columbian Exposition Issues		Unknown	Unknown	destroyed in the Spanish Civil War
233	1893	Columbian Exposition Issues		The Ships of Columbus	Gustav Adolf Closs	
234	1893	Columbian Exposition Issues		Columbus at the Court of Ferdinand and Isabella	Václav Brožík	
235	1893	Columbian Exposition Issues		Columbus door panel at the U.S. Capitol building	Randolph Rogers	U.S. Capitol, Washington, D.C., United States
236	1893	Columbian Exposition Issues		The Affectionate Reception of Columbus by Ferdinand and Isabella	Francisco Jover y Casanova	Valladolid University, Valladolid, Spain
237	1893	Columbian Exposition Issues		Return of Columbus and Reception at Court	Luigi Gregori	University of Notre Dame, Notre Dame, Indiana, United States
238	1893	Columbian Exposition Issues		Unknown	Ricardo Baloca y Cancico	destroyed in the Spanish Civil War
239	1893	Columbian Exposition Issues		Columbus Before the Franciscans at La Rabida	Felipe Maso de Falp	
240	1893	Columbian Exposition Issues		The Recall of Columbus	A. G. Heaton	
241	1893	Columbian Exposition Issues		Isabella Pledging Her Jewels	Antonio Muñoz Degrain	
242	1893	Columbian Exposition Issues		Columbus in Chains	Emmanuel Leutze	Germantown, Philadelphia, United States
243	1893	Columbian Exposition Issues		Columbus Before the Catholic Kings	Francisco Jover y Casanova	
244	1893	Columbian Exposition Issues		Isabella portrait	Bartolomé Bermejo	
244	1893	Columbian Exposition Issues		Christopher Columbus portrait	Lorenzo Lotto	
245	1893	Columbian Exposition Issues		Christopher Columbus portrait	Olin L. Warner	
289	1898	Trans-Mississippi Exposition Issue		Troops Guarding Train	Frederic Remington	
291	1898	Trans-Mississippi Exposition Issue		The Gold Bug	Frederic Remington	
292	1898	Trans-Mississippi Exposition Issue		Western Cattle in Storm	John MacWhirter	
302	1903	Second Bureau Issues		Andrew Jackson portrait	Thomas Sully	National Gallery of Art, Washington, D.C., United States
306	1902			Martha Washington portrait	Gilbert Stuart	
328	1907	Jamestown Exposition Issue		John Smith portrait	Crispijn van de Passe Van de Passe family	
330	1907	Jamestown Exposition Issue		Pocahontas portrait	Simon van de Passe Van de Passe family	
331	1908	Third Bureau Issues		Benjamin Franklin bust	Jacques Caffieri	
332	1908	Third Bureau Issues		George Washington bust	Jean-Antoine Houdon	
367	1909	Lincoln Centenary of Birth Issue		Abraham Lincoln statue	Augustus Saint-Gaudens	
551	1925			Nathan Hale statue	Bela Pratt	
554	1923			George Washington bust	Clark Mills	
556	1925			Martha Washington portrait	Charles Francois Jalabert	
566	1922			Statue of Liberty	Frédéric Auguste Bartholdi	
567	1923			Golden Gate	William A. Coulter	
569	1923			American Buffalo	Charles R. Knight	
618	1925			Battle of Lexington	Henry Sandham	
619	1925			The Minute Man	Daniel Chester French	
628	1926			John Ericsson Memorial	James Earle Fraser	
629	1926			Battle of White Plains	Edmund Franklin Ward	
651	1929			Capture of Fort Sackville	Frederick Coffay Yohn	
680	1929			Battle of Fallen Timbers Monument	Bruce Saville	
688	1930			George Washington statue	Frank Vittor	
690	1931			Casimir Pulaski portrait	Henry Bryan Hall	
704	1932	Washington Bicentennial Issue		George Washington portrait	Charles Willson Peale	
705	1932	Washington Bicentennial Issue		George Washington bust	Jean-Antoine Houdon	
706	1932	Washington Bicentennial Issue		George Washington portrait	Charles Willson Peale	
707	1932	Washington Bicentennial Issue		George Washington portrait	Gilbert Stuart	
708	1932	Washington Bicentennial Issue		George Washington portrait	Charles Willson Peale	
709	1932	Washington Bicentennial Issue		George Washington portrait	Charles Peale Polk	
710	1932	Washington Bicentennial Issue		George Washington portrait	Charles Willson Peale	
711	1932	Washington Bicentennial Issue		George Washington portrait	John Trumbull	
712	1932	Washington Bicentennial Issue		George Washington portrait	John Trumbull	
713	1932	Washington Bicentennial Issue		George Washington portrait	Charles Balthazar Julien Févret de Saint-Mémin	
714	1932	Washington Bicentennial Issue		George Washington portrait	William Joseph Williams	
715	1932	Washington Bicentennial Issue		George Washington portrait	Gilbert Stuart	
719	1932			Discobolus	Myron	
720	1932			George Washington portrait	Gilbert Stuart	
734	1933			Tadeusz Kościuszko statue	Antoni Popiel	
737	1934			Arrangement in Grey and Black: The Artist's Mother	James Abbott McNeill Whistler	
798	1937			Signing of the Constitution	Junius Brutus Stearns	
799	1937			Kamehameha statue	Thomas Ridgeway Gould	
803	1938	Presidential Issue		Benjamin Harrison bust	Adolph Alexander Weinman	
808	1938	Presidential Issue		James Madison bust	Frederick William Sievers	
812	1938	Presidential Issue		Andrew Jackson statue	Belle Kinney Scholz	
814	1938	Presidential Issue		William Henry Harrison bust	Chester Beach	
815	1938	Presidential Issue		John Tyler bust	Charles Keck	
821	1938	Presidential Issue		Abraham Lincoln bust	Sarah Fisher Clampitt Ames	
823	1938	Presidential Issue		Ulysses S. Grant statue	Franklin Simmons	
895	1940	Pan American Union Issue		Primavera	Sandro Botticelli	Uffizi Gallery, Florence, Italy
898	1940	400th Anniversary of the Coronado Expedition Issue		Coronado and His Captains	Gerald R. Cassidy	
899	1940			Statue of Liberty	Frédéric Auguste Bartholdi	
902	1940			Emancipation Memorial	Thomas Ball	Lincoln Park, Washington, D.C., United States
904	1942			Daniel Boone mural	Gilbert White	
949	1947	Doctors Issue		The Doctor	Luke Fildes	Tate Britain, London, United Kingdom
973	1948			Bucky O'Neill Monument	Solon Borglum	Courthouse Plaza, Prescott, Arizona, United States
989	1950			Statue of Freedom	Thomas Crawford	U.S. Capitol, Washington, D.C., United States
1001	1951	75th Anniversary of Colorado Statehood Issue		Bucking Bronco	Alexander Phimister Proctor	Denver, Colorado, United States
1011	1952			Mount Rushmore National Memorial	Gutzon Borglum & Lincoln Borglum	Black Hills, Keystone, South Dakota, United States
1020	1953			Louisiana Purchase statue	Karl Bitter	
1035	1954			Statue of Liberty	Frédéric Auguste Bartholdi	
1038	1954			James Monroe portrait	Rembrandt Peale	James Monroe Law Office, Fredericksburg, Virginia, United States
1041	1954			Statue of Liberty	Frédéric Auguste Bartholdi	
1044A	1961			Statue of Liberty	Frédéric Auguste Bartholdi	
1060	1954			The Sower	Emmanuel Leutze	Nebraska State Capitol, Lincoln, Nebraska, United States
1064	1955	American Bicentennial Issue		The Artist in His Museum	Charles Willson Peale	Pennsylvania Academy of the Fine Arts, Philadelphia, Pennsylvania, United States
1073	1956			Benjamin Franklin Drawing Electricity from the Sky	Benjamin West	Philadelphia Museum of Art, Philadelphia, Pennsylvania, United States
1082	1956			Labor is Life	Lumen Martin Winter	AFL–CIO Headquarters Building, Washington, D.C. United States
1105	1958			James Monroe portrait	Gilbert Stuart	
1107	1958	Geophysical Year Issue		The Creation of Adam	Michelangelo Buonarroti	
1113	1959	Lincoln Sesquicentennial Issue		Abraham Lincoln portrait	George Peter Alexander Healy	Corcoran Gallery of Art, Washington, D.C., United States
1114	1959	Lincoln Sesquicentennial Issue		Abraham Lincoln bust	Gutzon Borglum	U.S. Capitol, Washington, D.C., United States
1116	1959	Lincoln Sesquicentennial Issue		Abraham Lincoln	Daniel Chester French	Lincoln Memorial, Washington, D.C., United States
1176	1961	Range Conservation Issue		The Trail Boss	Charles Marion Russell	
1187	1961			The Smoke Signal	Frederic Remington	Amon Carter Museum of American Art, Fort Worth, Texas, United States
1207	1962	Winslow Homer Issue		Breezing Up (A Fair Wind)	Winslow Homer	
1241	1963			Columbia Jays	John James Audubon	
1243	1964	Charles M. Russell Issue		Jerked Down	Charles Marion Russell	
1244	1964			Unisphere	Gilmore David Clarke	
1259	1964	Fine Arts Issue		To the Fine Arts	Stuart Davis	
1273	1965			The Copley Family	John Singleton Copley	
1321	1966	Christmas Issue		Madonna and Child with Angels	Hans Memling	National Gallery of Art, Washington, D.C., United States
1322	1966			The Boating Party	Mary Cassatt	National Gallery of Art, Washington, D.C., United States
1335	1967			The Biglin Brothers Racing	Thomas Eakins	National Gallery of Art, Washington, D.C., United States
1336	1967	Christmas Issue		Madonna and Child with Angels	Hans Memling	National Gallery of Art, Washington, D.C., United States
1363	1968	Christmas Issue		The Annunciation	Jan van Eyck	
1364	1968	American Indian Issue		Chief Joseph portrait	Cyrenius Hall	National Portrait Gallery, Washington, D.C., United States
1370	1969			July Fourth	Grandma Moses	
1384	1969	Christmas Issue		Winter Sunday in Norway, Maine	Unknown	Fenimore Art Museum, Cooperstown, New York, United States
1386	1969			Old Models	William Harnett	
1390	1970			The Age of Reptiles	Rudolph F. Zallinger	Peabody Museum of Natural History, New Haven, Connecticut, United States
1391	1970			The Lighthouse at Two Lights	Edward Hopper	
1414	1970	Christmas Issue		The Nativity	Lorenzo Lotto	
1426	1971			Independence and the Opening of the West	Thomas Hart Benton	
1433	1971			The Wake of the Ferry	John French Sloan	
1444	1971	Christmas Issue		The Adoration of the Shepherds	Giorgione	National Gallery of Art, Washington, D.C., United States
1470	1972	American Folklore Issue		Tom Sawyer	Norman Rockwell	
1471	1972	Christmas Issue		Mary, Queen of Heaven	Master of the Legend of Saint Lucy	National Gallery of Art, Washington, D.C., United States
1475	1973			Love	Robert Indiana	
1503	1973			Lyndon B. Johnson portrait	Elizabeth Shoumatoff	
1507	1973	Christmas Issue		The Small Cowper Madonna	Raphael	
1530	1974	Universal Postal Union Issue		School of Athens	Raphael	
1531	1974	Universal Postal Union Issue		Five Feminine Virtues	Hokusai	
1532	1974	Universal Postal Union Issue		Old Scraps	John F. Peto	
1533	1974	Universal Postal Union Issue		The Lovely Reader	Jean-Étienne Liotard	
1534	1974	Universal Postal Union Issue		Lady Writing Letter	Gerard ter Borch	
1535	1974	Universal Postal Union Issue		Inkwell & Quill	Jean-Baptiste-Siméon Chardin	
1536	1974	Universal Postal Union Issue		Mrs. John Douglas	Thomas Gainsborough	
1537	1974	Universal Postal Union Issue		Don Antonio Noriega	Francisco Goya	
1550	1974			The Road, Winter	Currier and Ives	
1579	1975			Madonna and Child	Domenico Ghirlandaio	
1629-1631	1976	American Bicentennial Issue		The Spirit of '76	Archibald Willard	
1686	1976	American Bicentennial Issues		Surrender of Cornwallis at Yorktown	John Trumbull	
1687	1976	American Bicentennial Issues		Declaration of Independence	John Trumbull	
1688	1976	American Bicentennial Issues		Washington Crossing the Delaware	Eastman Johnson	
1689	1976	American Bicentennial Issues		Washington Reviewing His Army at Valley Forge	William B. T. Trego	
1691-1694	1976	American Bicentennial Issue		Declaration of Independence	John Trumbull	
1701	1976	Christmas Issue		The Nativity	John Singleton Copley	
1704	1977	American Bicentennial Issue		Washington at Princeton	Charles Willson Peale	
1722	1977	American Bicentennial Issue		Herkimer at Oriskany	Frederick Coffay Yohn	
1728	1977	American Bicentennial Issue		Surrender of General Burgoyne	John Trumbull	
1729	1977	Christmas Issue		George Washington at Valley Forge	J. C. Leyendecker	
1732	1978			James Cook portrait	Nathaniel Dance-Holland	
1768	1978			Madonna and Child with Cherubim	Andrea della Robbia	National Gallery of Art, Washington, D.C., United States
1799	1979	Christmas Issue		The Rest on the Flight into Egypt	Gerard David	National Gallery of Art, Washington, D.C., United States
1833	1980	Education Issue		Homage to the Square: Glow	Josef Albers	
2026	1982	Christmas Issue		Madonna of the Goldfinch	Giovanni Battista Tiepolo	National Gallery of Art, Washington, D.C., United States
2107	1984	Christmas Issue		Madonna and Child	Filippo Lippi	
2165	1985	Christmas Issue		Madonna and Child	Luca della Robbia	Detroit Institute of Arts, Michigan
2244	1986	Christmas Issue		Madonna and Child	Pietro Perugino	National Gallery of Art, Washington, D.C., United States
2367	1987	Christmas Issue		A Gentleman in Adoration before the Madonna	Giovanni Battista Moroni	National Gallery of Art, Washington, D.C., United States
2427	1989	Christmas Issue		The Dream of St. Catherine of Alexandria	Ludovico Carracci	National Gallery of Art, Washington, D.C., United States
2513	1990			Dwight D. Eisenhower portrait	James Anthony Wills	
2514	1990	Christmas Issue		Madonna and Child	Antonello da Messina	
2578	1991	Christmas Issue		Virgin and Child with Donor	Antoniazzo Romano	
2625	1992			The Landing of Columbus	John Vanderlyn	
2710	1992	Christmas Issue		Madonna and Child With Saints	Giovanni Bellini	
2789	1993	Christmas Issue		Madonna and Child in a Landscape	Cima da Conegliano	
2871	1994	Christmas Issue		Virgin and Child	Elisabetta Sirani	
3003	1995	Christmas Issue		Madonna and Child	Giotto di Bondone	
3069	1996			Red Poppy	Georgia O'Keeffe	Private Collection
3088	1996			Young Corn	Grant Wood	
3107	1996	Christmas Issue		Madonna and Child from Adoration of the Shepherds	Paolo de Matteis	
3176	1997	Christmas Issue		Madonna and Child with Saint Jerome	Sano di Pietro	National Gallery of Art, Washington, D.C., United States
3182h	1998	Celebrate the Century Issue		Stag at Sharkey's	George Bellows	
3182m	1998	Celebrate the Century Issue		Gibson Girl	Charles Dana Gibson	
3183d	1998	Celebrate the Century Issue		Nude Descending a Staircase, No. 2	Marcel Duchamp	
3183i	1998	Celebrate the Century Issue		I Want You	James Montgomery Flagg	
3184c	1998	Celebrate the Century Issue		Prohibition Enforced	Ben Shahn	Museum of the City of New York, New York, United States
3184h	1998	Celebrate the Century Issue		The Blues	John Held, Jr.	
3184n	1998	Celebrate the Century Issue		Automat	Edward Hopper	
3198	1998	Alexander Calder Issue		Black Cascade, 13 Verticals	Alexander Calder	
3199	1998	Alexander Calder Issue		Untitled	Alexander Calder	
3200	1998	Alexander Calder Issue		Rearing Stallion	Alexander Calder	
3201	1998	Alexander Calder Issue		Portrait of a Young Man	Alexander Calder	
3202	1998	Alexander Calder Issue		Un effet du japonais	Alexander Calder	
3236a	1998	American Art Issue		Portrait of Richard Mather	John Foster	
3236b	1998	American Art Issue		Mrs. Elizabeth Freake and Baby Mary	Freake Limner	
3236c	1998	American Art Issue		Girl in Red Dress with Cat and Dog	Ammi Phillips	
3236d	1998	American Art Issue		Rubens Peale with a Geranium	Rembrandt Peale	
3236e	1998	American Art Issue		Long-billed Curlew, Numenis Longrostris	John James Audubon	
3236f	1998	American Art Issue		Boatmen on the Missouri	George Caleb Bingham	
3236g	1998	American Art Issue		Kindred Spirits	Asher Brown Durand	
3236h	1998	American Art Issue		The Westwood Children	Joshua Johnson	
3236i	1998	American Art Issue		Music and Literature	William Harnett	
3236j	1998	American Art Issue		The Fog Warning	Winslow Homer	
3236k	1998	American Art Issue		White Cloud, Head Chief of the Iowas	George Catlin	
3236l	1998	American Art Issue		Cliffs of Green River	Thomas Moran	
3236m	1998	American Art Issue		The Last of the Buffalo	Albert Bierstadt	
3236n	1998	American Art Issue		Niagara	Frederic Edwin Church	
3236o	1998	American Art Issue		Breakfast in Bed	Mary Cassatt	The Huntington Library, Art Collections and Botanical Gardens, San Marino, California, United States
3236p	1998	American Art Issue		Nighthawks	Edward Hopper	Art Institute of Chicago, Chicago, Illinois, United States
3236q	1998	American Art Issue		American Gothic	Grant Wood	
3236r	1998	American Art Issue		Two Against the White	Charles Sheeler	
3236s	1998	American Art Issue		Mahoning	Franz Kline	
3236t	1998	American Art Issue		No. 12	Mark Rothko	
3187h	1999	Celebrate the Century Issue		The Cat in the Hat	Dr. Seuss	
3338	1999	Frederick Olmsted Issue		Frederick Law Olmsted	John Singer Sargent	Biltmore Estate, Asheville, North Carolina, United States
3355	1999	Christmas Issue		Madonna and Child	Bartolomeo Vivarini	
3662	2002	Andy Warhol Issue		Self-Portrait 1964	Andy Warhol	
3675	2002	Christmas Issue		Madonna and Child	Jan Gossaert	Art Institute of Chicago, Chicago, Illinois, United States
3804	2003	American Treasures Series		Young Mother	Mary Cassatt	
3805	2003	American Treasures Series		Children Playing on the Beach	Mary Cassatt	
3806	2003	American Treasures Series		On a Balcony	Mary Cassatt	
3807	2003	American Treasures Series		Child in a Straw Hat	Mary Cassatt	
3937a	2005	To Form a More Perfect Union		Training for War	William H. Johnson	
3937d	2005	To Form a More Perfect Union		America Cares/Little Rock Nine	George Hunt	Little Rock Central High School National Historic Site visitor center, Little Rock, Arkansas, United States
3937e	2005	To Form a More Perfect Union		Walking	Charles Alston	
3937f	2005	To Form a More Perfect Union		Freedom Riders	May Stevens	
3937g	2005	To Form a More Perfect Union		Dixie Café	Jacob Lawrence	
3937h	2005	To Form a More Perfect Union		March on Washington	Alma Thomas	National Gallery of Art, Washington, D.C., United States
3937i	2005	To Form a More Perfect Union		The Crossing of the Edmund Pettus Bridge in Selma	Bernice Sims	
3937j	2005	To Form a More Perfect Union		The Lamp	Romare Bearden	
4021	2006	Benjamin Franklin Issue		The Declaration of Independence	John Trumbull	
4021	2006	Benjamin Franklin Issue		Benjamin Franklin portrait	Joseph-Siffred Duplessis	
4022	2006	Benjamin Franklin Issue		Benjamin Franklin portrait	Charles Elliott Mills	Benjamin Franklin Institute of Technology, Boston, Massachusetts, United States
4023	2006	Benjamin Franklin Issue		Benjamin Franklin portrait	Michael Dooling	
4024	2006	Benjamin Franklin Issue		Benjamin Franklin portrait	Charles Willson Peale	
4024	2006	Benjamin Franklin Issue		Benjamin Franklin portrait	David Martin	The White House Historical Association, Washington, D.C., United States
4346	2008	American Treasures Series		Valley of the Yosemite	Albert Bierstadt	Museum of Fine Arts, Boston, Massachusetts, United States
4444a	2010	American Expressionists		The Golden Wall	Hans Hofmann	
4444b	2010	American Expressionists		Asheville	Willem de Kooning	
4444c	2010	American Expressionists		Orange and Yellow	Mark Rothko	
4444d	2010	American Expressionists		Convergence	Jackson Pollock	
4444e	2010	American Expressionists		The Liver Is the Cock's Comb	Arshile Gorky	
4444f	2010	American Expressionists		1948-C	Clyfford Still	
4444g	2010	American Expressionists		Elegy to the Spanish Republic No. 34	Robert Motherwell	
4444h	2010	American Expressionists		La Grande Vallée	Joan Mitchell	
4444i	2010	American Expressionists		Romanesque Façade	Adolph Gottlieb	
4444j	2010	American Expressionists		Achilles	Barnett Newman	
4473	2010	American Treasures Series		Boys in a Pasture	Winslow Homer	Museum of Fine Arts, Boston, Massachusetts
4477	2010	Angel with Lute Issue		Angel with Lute	Melozzo da Forlì	Vatican Museums, Vatican City
4504	2011	George Washington Issue		copy of Lansdowne Portrait	Gilbert Stuart	
4558	2011	American Treasures Series		The Long Leg	Edward Hopper	The Huntington Library, Art Collections and Botanical Gardens, San Marino, California, United States
4748a	2013	Modern Art in America		I Saw the Figure 5 in Gold	Charles Demuth	
4748b	2013	Modern Art in America		Sunset, Maine Coast	John Marin	
4748c	2013	Modern Art in America		House and Street	Stuart Davis	
4748d	2013	Modern Art in America		Painting Number 5	Marsden Hartley	
4748e	2013	Modern Art in America		Black Mesa Landscape, New Mexico/Out Back of Marie’s II	Georgia O'Keeffe	Georgia O'Keeffe Museum, Santa Fe, New Mexico
4748f	2013	Modern Art in America		Noire et Blanche	Man Ray	
4748g	2013	Modern Art in America		The Prodigal Son	Aaron Douglas	
4748h	2013	Modern Art in America		American Landscape	Charles Sheeler	
4748i	2013	Modern Art in America		Brooklyn Bridge	Joseph Stella	
4748j	2013	Modern Art in America		Razor	Gerald Murphy	
4748k	2013	Modern Art in America		Nude Descending a Staircase, No. 2	Marcel Duchamp	
4748l	2013	Modern Art in America		Fog Horns	Arthur Dove	
4917	2014	American Treasures Series		Grand Canyon of the Yellowstone	Thomas Moran	Nelson-Atkins Museum of Art, Kansas City, Missouri
4918	2014	American Treasures Series		Summer Afternoon	Asher B. Durand	Metropolitan Museum of Art, New York, NY
4919	2014	American Treasures Series		Sunset	Frederic Edwin Church	Munson Art Institute, Utica, New York
4920	2014	American Treasures Series		Distant View of Niagara Falls	Thomas Cole	Art Institute of Chicago, Illinois
4968	2015	Martín Ramírez Issue		Untitled (Horse and Rider with Trees)	Martín Ramírez	
4969	2015	Martín Ramírez Issue		Untitled (Man Riding Donkey)	Martín Ramírez	
4970	2015	Martín Ramírez Issue		Untitled (Train on Inclined Tracks)	Martín Ramírez	
4971	2015	Martín Ramírez Issue		Untitled (Deer)	Martín Ramírez	
4972	2015	Martín Ramírez Issue		Untitled (Tunnel with Cars and Buses)	Martín Ramírez	
5143	2016	Christmas Issue		Madonna and Child	Follower of Fra Filippo Lippi and Pesellino	National Gallery of Art, Washington, D.C.
5212a	2017	Andrew Wyeth Issue		Wind from the Sea	Andrew Wyeth	National Gallery of Art, Washington, D.C.
5212b	2017	Andrew Wyeth Issue		Big Room	Andrew Wyeth	Private collection
5212c	2017	Andrew Wyeth Issue		Christina's World	Andrew Wyeth	Museum of Modern Art, New York, NY
5212d	2017	Andrew Wyeth Issue		Alvaro and Christina	Andrew Wyeth	Farnsworth Art Museum, Rockland, Maine
5212e	2017	Andrew Wyeth Issue		Frostbitten	Andrew Wyeth	Private collection
5212f	2017	Andrew Wyeth Issue		Sailor’s Valentine	Andrew Wyeth	Private collection
5212g	2017	Andrew Wyeth Issue		Soaring	Andrew Wyeth	Shelburne Museum, Shelburne, Vermont
5212h	2017	Andrew Wyeth Issue		North Light	Andrew Wyeth	Brandywine Museum of Art, Chadd's Ford, Pennsylvania
5212i	2017	Andrew Wyeth Issue		Spring Fed	Andrew Wyeth	Private collection
5212j	2017	Andrew Wyeth Issue		The Carry	Andrew Wyeth	Private collection
5212k	2017	Andrew Wyeth Issue		Young Bull	Andrew Wyeth	Private collection
5212l	2017	Andrew Wyeth Issue		My Studio	Andrew Wyeth	Private collection
5382	2019	Ellsworth Kelly Issue		Yellow White	Ellsworth Kelly	Beyeler Foundation, Switzerland
5383	2019	Ellsworth Kelly Issue		Colors for a Large Wall	Ellsworth Kelly	Museum of Modern Art, New York, NY
5384	2019	Ellsworth Kelly Issue		Blue Red Rocker	Ellsworth Kelly	Stedelijk Museum Amsterdam, Netherlands
5385	2019	Ellsworth Kelly Issue		Spectrum I	Ellsworth Kelly	San Francisco Museum of Modern Art, California
5386	2019	Ellsworth Kelly Issue		South Ferry	Ellsworth Kelly	
5387	2019	Ellsworth Kelly Issue		Blue Green	Ellsworth Kelly	Private collection
5388	2019	Ellsworth Kelly Issue		Orange Red Relief (for Delphine Seyrig)	Ellsworth Kelly	Museo Reina Sofía, Madrid, Spain
5389	2019	Ellsworth Kelly Issue		Meschers	Ellsworth Kelly	Museum of Modern Art, New York, NY
5390	2019	Ellsworth Kelly Issue		Red Blue	Ellsworth Kelly	Museum of Modern Art, New York, NY
5391	2019	Ellsworth Kelly Issue		Gaza	Ellsworth Kelly	San Francisco Museum of Modern Art, California
5504	2020	Ruth Asawa Issue		Three Untitled Sculptures from 1958, 1978 and 1959	Ruth Asawa	
5505	2020	Ruth Asawa Issue		Untitled Sculpture From 1959	Ruth Asawa	
5506	2020	Ruth Asawa Issue		Untitled Sculpture From 1958	Ruth Asawa	
5507	2020	Ruth Asawa Issue		Untitled Sculpture From 1955	Ruth Asawa	
5508	2020	Ruth Asawa Issue		Untitled Sculpture From 1955	Ruth Asawa	
5509	2020	Ruth Asawa Issue		Untitled Sculpture From 1980	Ruth Asawa	
5510	2020	Ruth Asawa Issue		Untitled Sculpture From 1978	Ruth Asawa	
5511	2020	Ruth Asawa Issue		Untitled Sculpture From 1952	Ruth Asawa	
5512	2020	Ruth Asawa Issue		Untitled Sculpture From 1954	Ruth Asawa	
5513	2020	Ruth Asawa Issue		Six Untitled Sculptures From Various Years	Ruth Asawa	
5143	2020	Christmas Issue		Our Lady of Guápulo	unknown Peruvian painter	Metropolitan Museum of Art, New York, NY
5594	2021	Emilio Sanchez Issue		Los Toldos	Emilio Sanchez	
5595	2021	Emilio Sanchez Issue		Ty’s Place	Emilio Sanchez	
5596	2021	Emilio Sanchez Issue		En el Souk	Emilio Sanchez	
5597	2021	Emilio Sanchez Issue		Untitled (Ventanita Entreabierta)	Emilio Sanchez	
5688	2022	George Morrison Issue		Sun and River	George Morrison	Plains Art Museum, Fargo, North Dakot
5689	2022	George Morrison Issue		Phenomena Against the Crimson	George Morrison	Minnesota Museum of American Art, St. Paul, MN
5690	2022	George Morrison Issue		Lake Superior Landscape	George Morrison	Minneapolis Institute of Art, Minnesota
5691	2022	George Morrison Issue		Spirit Path, New Day Red Rock Variation	George Morrison	Minnesota Museum of American Art, St. Paul, MN
5692	2022	George Morrison Issue		Untitled	George Morrison	Private collection
5143	2020	Christmas Issue		Virgin and Child	Master of the Scandicci Lamentation	Museum of Fine Arts, Boston, Massachusetts
5792	2023	Roy Lichtenstein Issue		Standing Explosion (Red)	Roy Lichtenstein	Crystal Bridges Museum of American Art, Bentonville, AR
5793	2023	Roy Lichtenstein Issue		Modern Painting I	Roy Lichtenstein	Frederick R. Weisman Art Foundation
5794	2023	Roy Lichtenstein Issue		Still Life with Crystal Bowl	Roy Lichtenstein	Whitney Museum of American Art, New York, NY
5795	2023	Roy Lichtenstein Issue		Still Life with Goldfish	Roy Lichtenstein	Private collection
5796	2023	Roy Lichtenstein Issue		Portrait of a Woman	Roy Lichtenstein	Private collection

== See also ==
- For a list of persons portrayed on U.S. stamps see People on stamps of the United States.
- Presidents of the United States on U.S. postage stamps
- List of paintings on Soviet postage stamps
