= Madonna del Sacco =

Madonna del Sacco is the name of the following names:

- Madonna del Sacco (Andrea del Sarto), a 1525 fresco painting by Andrea del Sarto
- Madonna del Sacco (Perugino), a 1495–1500 oil-on-panel painting by Pietro Perugino
