= Emilio Sánchez (disambiguation) =

Emilio Sánchez (born 1965) is a Spanish tennis player.

Emilio Sánchez may also refer to:

- Emilio Sánchez Perrier (1855–1907), Spanish painter
- Emilio Sanchez (artist) (1921–1999), Cuban artist
- Emilio Sánchez Piedras (1927–1981), Mexican politician
- Emilio Sánchez (footballer) (born 1985), Spanish footballer
- Alfonso Emilio Sánchez (born 1994), Mexican footballer
- Emilio Sanchez, character in Inheritance (2020 film)
