= Frank Maresca =

Frank Maresca may refer to:

- Frank "The Entertainer" Maresca, star of the VH1 reality television show Frank the Entertainer in a Basement Affair
- Frank Maresca (art dealer) (born 1948), American art dealer
