= Certosa di Pavia Altarpiece =

Altarpiece by Pietro Perugino

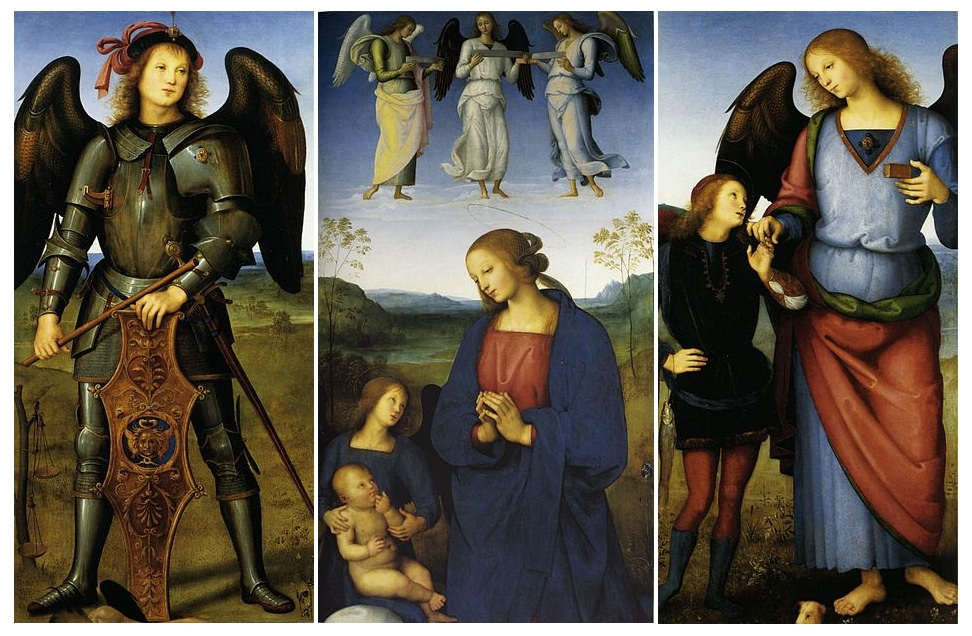
- The three London panels
- Artist: Pietro Perugino
- Year: c. 1496–1500
- Location: National Gallery, London

The Certosa di Pavia Altarpiece was an oil on panel altarpiece by Pietro Perugino. It dates to around 1496 to 1500; three of the original six panels are now in the National Gallery, London. The central panel is an adaptation of the artist's Madonna del Sacco.

== History ==
It was commissioned by Ludovico Sforza, ruler of Milan, for the chapel of Saint Michael in the Certosa di Pavia, a building symbolic of the Visconti-Sforza's patronage of the church and the arts. He had already sent an agent to Florence in 1490 to find out about the artistic scene and converse with Sandro Botticelli, Domenico Ghirlandaio, Filippino Lippi and Pietro Vannucci. Sforza initially commissioned a Deposition from Lippi, but this was not completed and so he instead decided in 1494 to commission Perugino.

The altarpiece originally had six panels. The central lower panel shows the Madonna and Child with angels, whilst the left panel shows the archangel Michael trampling Satan and the right panel shows Tobias and the Angel (the Archangel Raphael). The horizon on the side panels is no longer at the same level as that in the central panel, showing how all three panels seem to have been cut down. The knees of the Madonna and the bag on the left hand side of the central panel are lost, whilst little remains of the serpent at Michael's feet and the small dog at Raphael's feet.

The top panel, with the figure of the Eternal Father is the only one to remain at the Certosa di Pavia, while three panels were looted in 1784 and were acquired by the National Gallery in London in 1856. Some 1950s photographs show a non-original pediment above the side panels, which has now been removed. In place of the London panels are three copies painted in 1586.

== Sources ==
- Three panels from an altarpiece; Pietro Perugino; National Gallery, London
