= Memphis in May =

Month-long festival in Tennessee, US

Memphis in May International Festival
- Genre: All
- Dates: September 2021–April 2022; 15–17 October 2021: Beale Street Music Festival/International Week; 29 September–02 October 2021: World Championship Barbecue Cooking Contest; 28 April 2021: 901Fest; 30 October 2021: Great American River Run
- Location: Memphis, Tennessee
- Years active: 1977–2019, 2022–
- Founders: Memphis in May Events Committees
- Organizer: Mack Weaver
- Website: http://memphisinmay.org

Memphis in May International Festival is a month-long festival held in Memphis, Tennessee. The festival, which is saluting South Korea in 2025, honors a specific foreign country every year and features many events. The Beale Street Music Festival takes place the first weekend in May and showcases an eclectic lineup of national and local musical talent. International Week is a series of exhibits, screenings, arts and performances dedicated to each year's honored country. The World Championship Barbecue Cooking Contest has become one of the most popular barbecue contests in the country and has been observed for 48 years. The Great American River Run Half Marathon & 5K welcomes runners of all experience levels through the streets of Memphis and along the banks of the Mississippi River, while 901Fest includes a salute to all things Memphis.

== Beale Street Music Festival (BSMF) ==
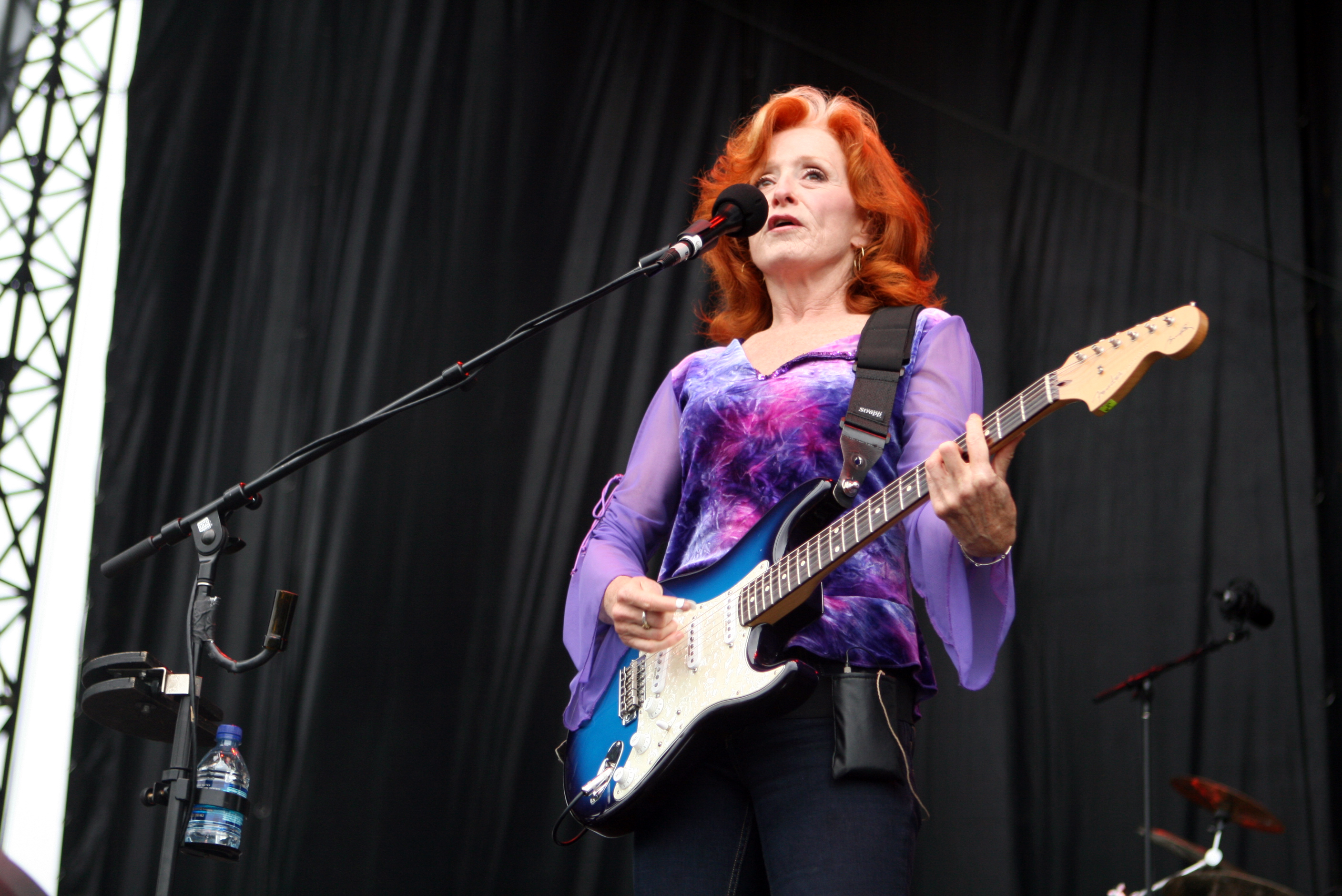
Bonnie Raitt performs at the Beale Street Music Festival as part of Memphis in May in 2009.

=== About ===
The Beale Street Music Festival is a three-day music festival that has both a mix of big-name stars and local musical acts. Held during the first weekend of May in the city's Tom Lee Park at the foot of Beale Street, it is considered to be the kick-off event of the entire Memphis in May International Festival celebration. It typically hosts over 100,000 people during the weekend. The Beale Street Music Festival is the only program that has been held every year since the inception of Memphis in May in 1977. Its history can be traced back to the 1800s, when African-American musicians throughout the South would come to Beale Street and perform.

=== Past Performers ===
The Beale Street Music Festival is known for featuring an eclectic mix of genres on its lineup every year, from blues and rock 'n roll to rap and pop. The list of bands and musicians that have performed at the festival continue to grow each year, but the list includes Stevie Ray Vaughan, Ray Charles, B.B. King in '91 (d.2015, lived in Memphis), John Lee Hooker in '91, Booker T. and the M.G.'s in '99, Jerry Lee Lewis from Memphis in '03, Box Tops from Memphis in '97, Big Star in '99, Fuel from the Jackson, TN area in '04, Saliva from Memphis in '04, Willie Nelson, Lynyrd Skynyrd, Al Green in '09 (now a preacher in Memphis), Isaac Hayes from Memphis in '00 (d.2008), John Prine, James Brown, Bob Dylan, Black Crowes, Van Morrison, Dave Matthews Band, Widespread Panic, Foo Fighters, The Killers, Snoop Dogg, Kid Rock, John Mayer, Journey, Nelly, Steely Dan, Allman Brothers, Santana, James Taylor, Bobby "Blue" Bland, Korn, The Avett Brothers, Mumford & Sons, Kings of Leon from Nashville in '17, Paramore from Nashville in '15, 10 Years from Knoxville in '06, Soundgarden, Wiz Khalifa, Jane's Addiction, Chuck Berry, The Black Keys, Avenged Sevenfold, Alabama Shakes, Lenny Kravitz, Ed Sheeran, Neil Young, Beck, Paul Simon, Ziggy Marley, Sturgill Simpson, Aretha Franklin in '09 (d.2018, born in Memphis), Earth, Wind & Fire in '10 (Maurice White was born in Memphis and d.2016), Yo Gotti in '16, Three 6 Mafia (from Memphis) in '06, Weezer, and many more. The Strokes In May 2, 2014 performed at brake Street music festival was the first official show after 3 years since November 2011 since ending the Angles tour in 2011

Many of the festival's best known performers were immortalized in portraits by iconic Memphis painter George Hunt, who produced the Beale Street Music Festival's commemorative poster art for 28 years before his passing in December 2020.

== International Week ==
Every year the festival recognizes a different country, most recently saluting South Korea in 2025. A week of events that typically begin the day after the Beale Street Music Fest, International Week is dedicated to a country and showcases the foods and culture of that nation. While International Week provides a learning experience for the community at large, the core is a comprehensive educational program for area youth in public and private schools throughout Memphis and Shelby County. The goal of International Week is for area students, by the time they graduate from high school, to have had the opportunity to experience the customs and cultures of 12 countries. Six of the festival's honored countries — Japan, Canada, the Netherlands, France, South Korea, and Ireland – have been featured twice. Perhaps most important are the trade delegates that visit Memphis and have introductions to suitable, high-level trade partners.

=== Honored countries ===
Through the years, the Memphis in May International Festival has played host to ambassadors, exhibits and performance troupes from 38 countries. The milestone twentieth annual event in 1996 honored all previous selected countries. The 2019 event honored the bicentennials of the founding of the city of Memphis and of the establishment of Shelby County. Festivities were cancelled in 2020 and 2021 due to the ongoing effects of the COVID-19 pandemic. Ireland has been selected as the focus for 2026.

1977: Japan
1978: Canada
1979: Germany
1980: Venezuela
1981: Egypt
1982: Netherlands
1983: Israel
1984: Mexico
1985: Australia
1986: Japan
1987: China
1988: United Kingdom
1989: Kenya
1990: France
1991: New Zealand
1992: Italy
1993: Russia
1994: Côte d’Ivoire
1995: Thailand
1996: All previous countries
1997: Brazil
1998: Portugal
1999: Morocco
2000: India
2001: Netherlands
2002: Argentina
2003: South Korea
2004: South Africa
2005: Ireland
2006: Costa Rica
2007: Spain
2008: Turkey
2009: Chile
2010: Tunisia
2011: Belgium
2012: Philippines
2013: Sweden
2014: Panama
2015: Poland
2016: Canada
2017: Colombia
2018: Czech Republic
2019: City of Memphis & Shelby County
2020: Festivities cancelled due to COVID-19 pandemic
2021: International salute to Ghana postponed due to COVID-19 pandemic
2022: Ghana
2023: Malaysia
2024: France
2025: South Korea
2026: Ireland

== World Championship Barbecue Cooking Contest (WCBCC) ==
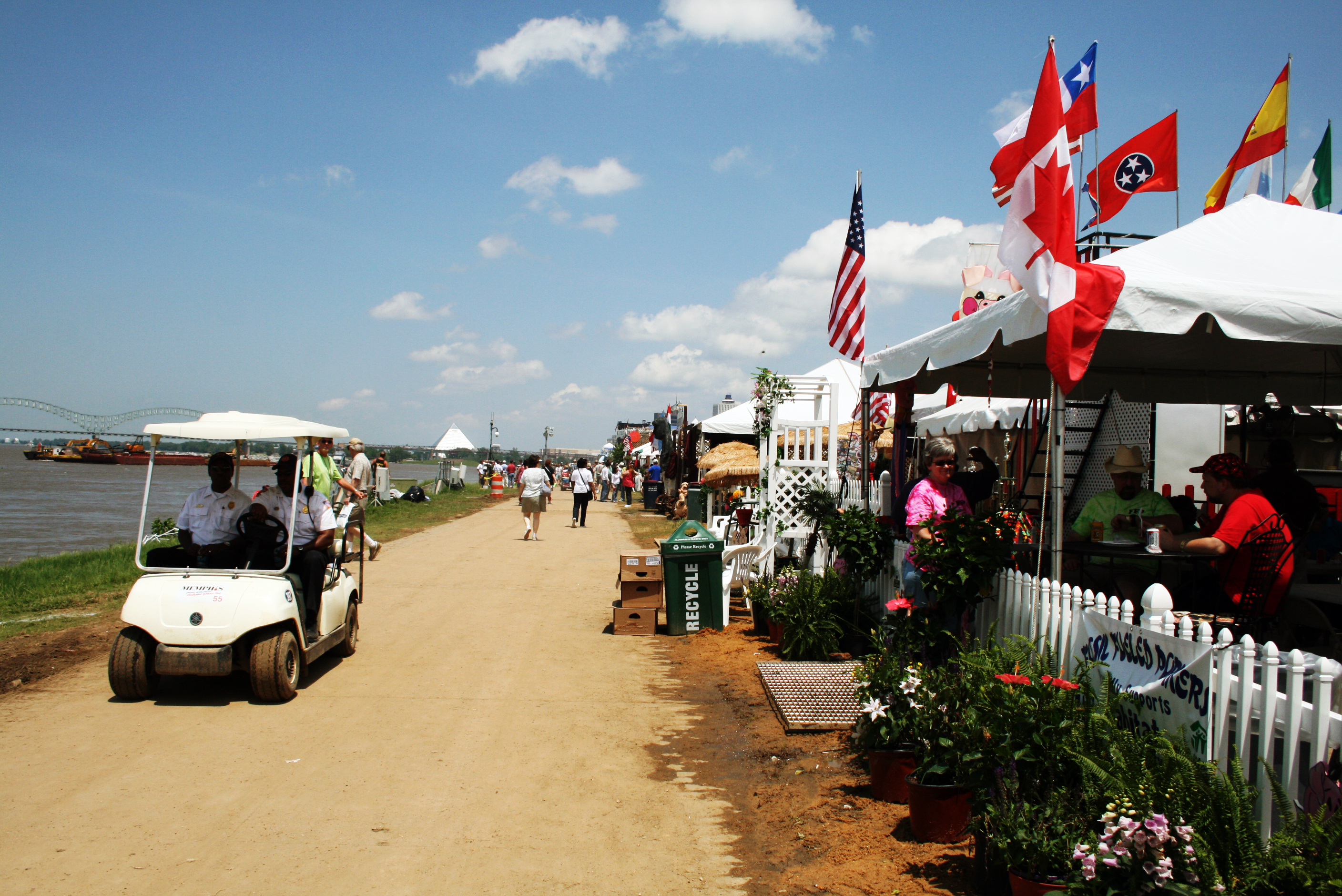
Tents at the Memphis in May barbecue world championship in 2009

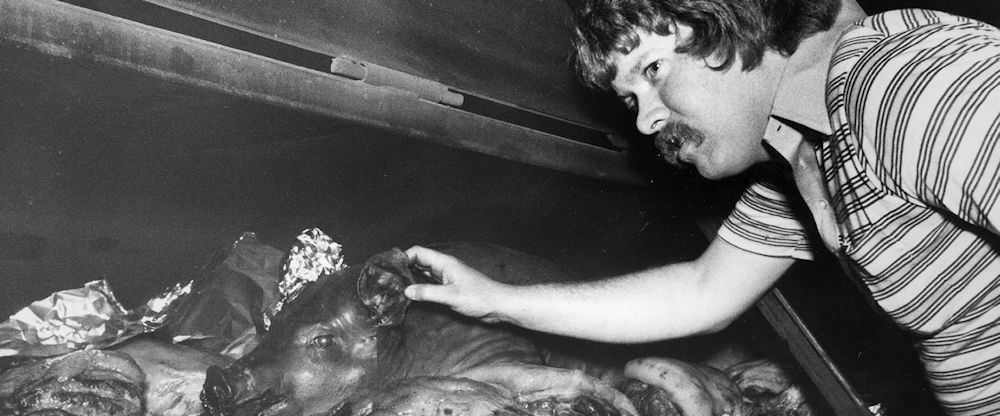
Leonard Gill of "Razorback Cookers" from Blytheville, AR checks on the whole hog he is cooking at the Memphis In May World Championship Barbecue Cooking Contest on May 2, 1980.

=== History ===
The WCBCC started in 1978 with 26 teams. The contest drew 50 teams in 1979, 80 in 1980, and 180 teams from nine states in 1981. It has now grown to be the largest pork barbecue competition in the world. More than 250 teams from 20+ states and several countries compete, and an estimated 100,000 people attend the competition. Media from around the world, including BBC and The Food Network, come to the city to cover the event.

Credit for the original idea of a barbecue contest goes to Rodney Baber, chairman of the Memphis in May events committee in 1977, and his co-worker Jack Powell, Tennessee's reigning chili champ at the time.

The original champion at the first competition was Bessie Louise Cathey, who won a $500 prize, a sizable return for her $12 entry fee. Today, the prizes for each event range from $300 to $15,000 for the main cooking competition, and from $250 to $2,500 for the ancillary contests. Today's entry fees range from $700 to $2,600 just for renting the necessary booth space, and an extra $60 per competition entry. Some teams regularly budget amounts in excess of $15,000 just for the competition and booth.

In 1989, when MIM officials discovered that there was a feast in Honolulu which earned the title of "largest barbecue" in the Guinness Book of Records, they calculated the amount of food prepared at the WCBCC. The total was 55,297 pounds of pork, and thus earned the WCBCC a record in the 1990 edition. Over 16 tons of pork were smoked at the 2016 WCBCC.

The 2017 World Championship Barbecue Cooking Contest was the first time the event spanned four days instead of three. In addition, the Big Bob Gibson Bar-B-Q team became the first five-time champion of the event (2017, '14, '11, '03, '00).

No contests were held in 2020-21.

=== Food events ===
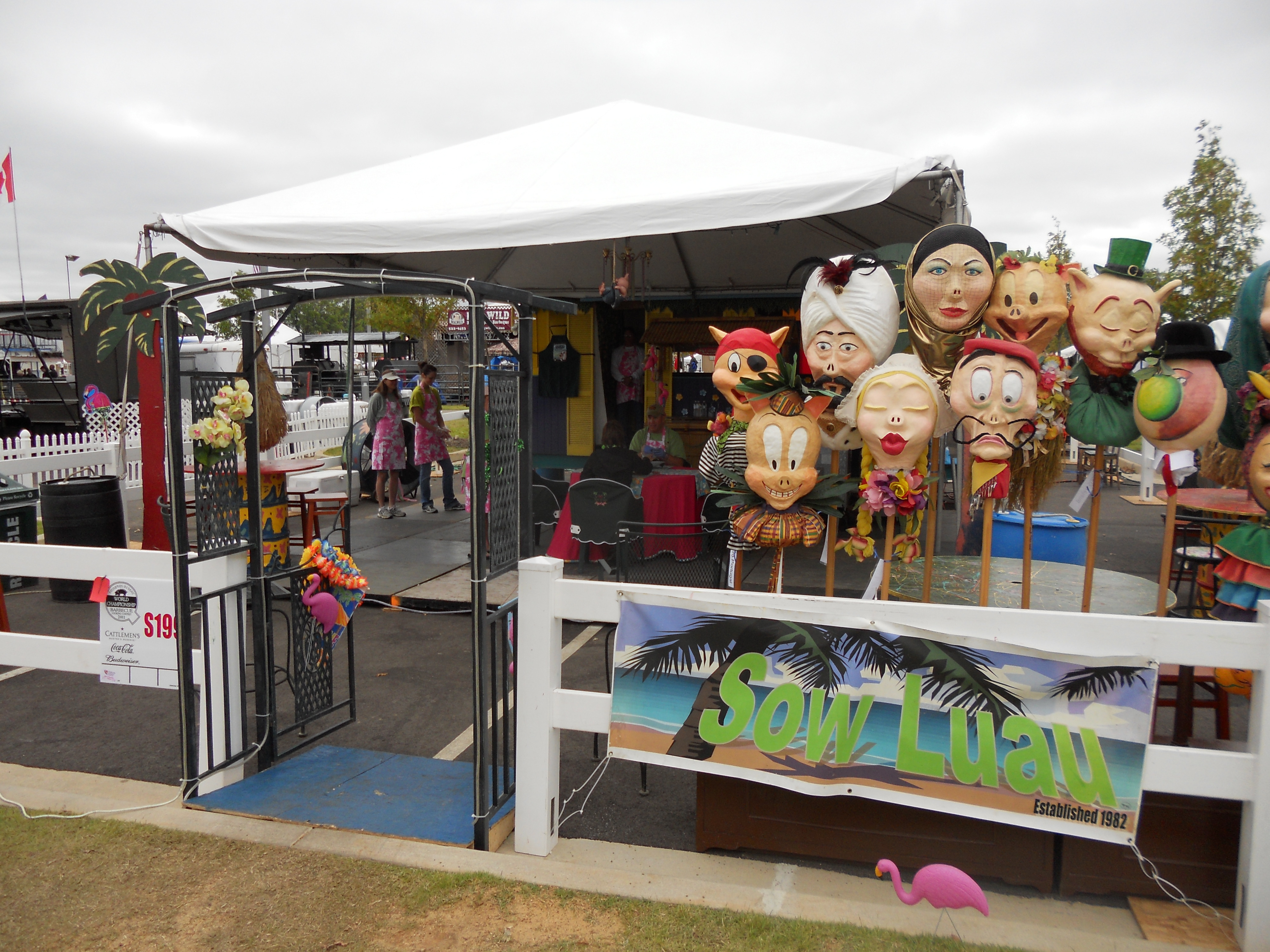
Pork Shoulder Event Judging

The competition has three official meat categories: rib, shoulder and whole hog. There is also the Patio Porkers division, which encourages up to 40 amateur teams (who have not previously won the Patio Porker division in the WCBCC) to enter. Only wood and charcoal cooking is allowed at the event, no gas or any other sort of heat system is allowed to be used.

Beyond those main categories, teams also compete in several other ancillary contests over the four-day event, including: Best Sauce (Tomato/Mustard/Vinegar), Frank's Red Hot Hot Wings, Kingsford Tour of Champions and Anything But (Exotic/Beef/Seafood/Poultry).

=== Special events ===
- Ms. Piggie - Teams dress up contestants as pigs, and then perform songs or skits on stage.
- Best Booth - Booths are judged on design, originality and connection with the honored country.
- T-Shirt Design - Shirts are judged on design, originality and connection with the honored country.
- Sauce Wrestling - Things get a little messy with this one as teams send a representative to the wrestling ring filled with over 40 gallons of barbecue sauce.
- Big Hog Run - Coined as "America's most prestigious .2K race," the Big Hog Run is a thrilling 656-foot sprint down Beale Street. Only WCBCC team members and judges are allowed to compete.
- Cooker Caravan - The Cooker Caravan provides the public a behind-the-scenes look at competition barbecue by offering guided tours to teams in each championship category.

== Great American River Run Half-Marathon & 5K ==
The Great American River Run made its Memphis in May debut in 2016. The race attracts runners of all experience level, featuring half marathon and 5K distances. The race course takes runners through downtown Memphis and along the banks of the Mississippi River.

The inaugural race drew over 2,000 runners from more than 30 states. Every registrant is given a race t-shirt and every finisher is awarded a medal.

The races went virtual in 2020-21.

== 901Fest ==
901Fest made its inaugural appearance at the 2016 Memphis in May International Festival. The programming for the event is centered around local musicians, artists, vendors and includes an air show and fireworks display.
