= George Hunt (artist) =

African American artist (1933–2020)

- Born: George Robert Hunt; July 6, 1933 rural Louisiana, US
- Died: December 4, 2020 (aged 87); Memphis, Tennessee, US
- Known for: Painting
- Movement: Cubism, Expressionism

George Hunt (July 6, 1933 – December 4, 2020) was a Southern American artist, best known for his portraits of Blues musicians and paintings for Music Festivals, which are exhibited in many private collections, galleries, museums, and the walls of Memphis businesses. As a artist, he added a calculated amount of collage to most of his paintings that gave a distinctive three dimensional texture to the works. For 28 years, Hunt created the official poster for the Memphis in May Beale Street Music Festival. Many people have seen his work or might even own it on a poster or T-shirt without knowing his name. He was selected to be the "official artist" of 2003's "Year of the Blues," a congressionally endorsed effort to increase appreciation of the Blues as one of America's great contributions to international arts culture. His art toured around the country promoting the celebration.

Hunt's work reflected his life experience growing up in the American South, including themes of African American life and the Civil Rights movement. His 1997 depiction of the Little Rock Nine, the nine brave students who desegregated Little Rock Central High School, was made into a U.S. postage stamp in 2005.

== Early life ==
George Robert Hunt was born on a Sugar Cane Plantation near Lake Charles, Louisiana. He spent his youth in Hot Springs, Arkansas, and later played football at the University of Arkansas at Pine Bluff, while studying art. His favorite artist from an early age was Pablo Picasso, but his life experiences would also inform his work, which includes themes of the Civil Rights Movement and African American Southern life and culture.

One such experience was in 1968, when Hunt was a volunteer to the Memphis funeral home to help load the casket of Reverend Doctor Martin Luther King Jr.'s body onto a plane for its return to Atlanta after his assassination.

Hunt taught art, and coached football and track at George Washington Carver High School in Memphis for three decades before he became a full time artist later in life.

== Career as an artist ==
Hunt went to the University of Memphis to pursue his studies in art further through post-graduate work. He also studied at New York University. His works have cubist and abstract expressionist qualities, but also identifiably depict historical figures and events. His paintings generally feature bright colors and bold strokes of acrylic paint, with collage including fabric and ephemera.

Willis Drinkard, proprietor of Gestine’s Gallery at 156 Beale St., provided managerial support for Hunt from 1989 to 1996. In 1992, one of Hunt's original paintings was featured on the first official Memphis in May Beale Street Music Festival Poster. Some consider that moment as the spark for Hunt's expanding popularity. name=tntribune />

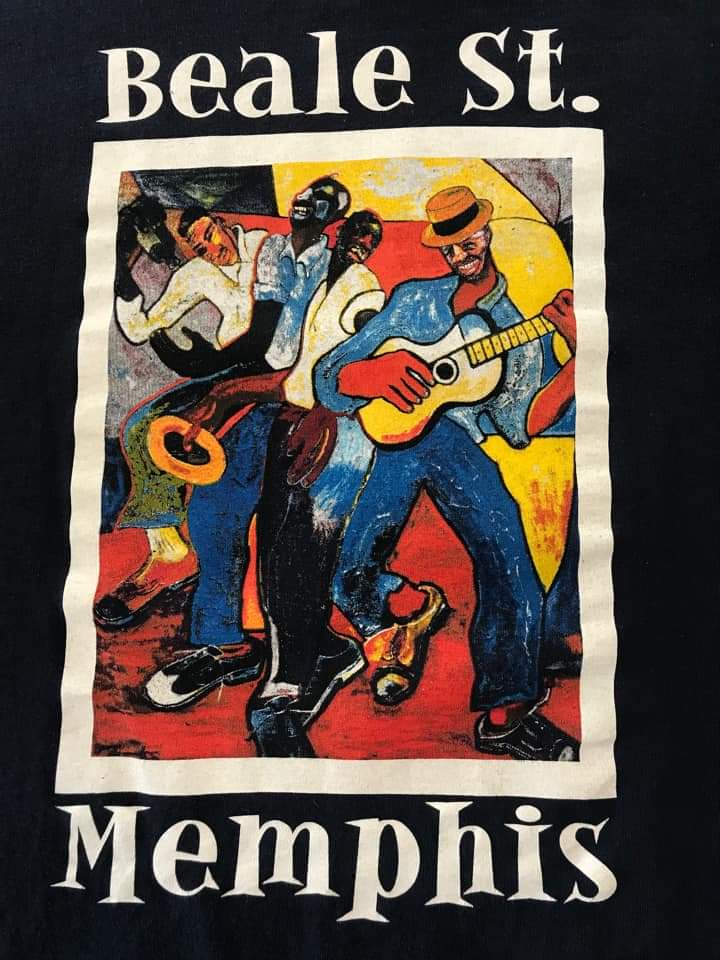
Beale St. Memphis t-shirt. Art by George Hunt.

In 1993, Hunt painted a piece titled "I Am A Man" as a tribute to the 1968 sanitation worker’s strike in Memphis, TN. A print of that painting now hangs in the National Museum of Civil Rights.

Hunt and Drinkard expanded his reputation with showings of his work at the New York Black Art Expo in 1995, 1996, 1997 and 1998.

Hunt was commissioned to paint something for the Little Rock Central High School National historic site. His “America Cares/Little Rock Nine,” created in 1997, became a U.S. Postage Stamp in 2005 as part of a set called “To Form A More Perfect Union.”

In 1998, he was selected to be the featured artist for the Rock & Roll Hall of Fame Museum’s American Music Master’s annual conference.

In 1998, Hunt was commissioned by curator David Simmons to paint portraits of 26 Blues Legends for the Blues & Legends Hall of Fame Museum in Robinsonville, Mississippi. Those paintings are now on permanently display at the Gateway to the Blues Museum in Tunica, Mississippi.

In 2002, the U.S. Congress declared 2003 the "Year of the Blues." Hunt was designated the Official Artist for the celebration and he created a new set of pieces for a national tour. The exhibit of 26 paintings was called "Conjurating the Blues, The High Cotton Tour." It depicted the history of blues music in America. The title painting hung in the Radio City Music Hall in New York during the opening show. Hunt was featured in many segments of the 13-part "Year of the Blues" PBS radio series, produced by the Experience Music Project, telling stories of his experience with blues music. Later in 2003, the Blues Foundation recognized his contribution with a "Keeping the Blues Alive" award.

In 2005, Hunt was selected as the artist for the New Orleans Jazz & Heritage Festival Congo Square poster. During the festival his work was exhibited at the Stella Jones Gallery and the Ogden Museum of Southern Art.

His vivid body of portraiture includes depictions of Sonny Boy Williamson, Furry Lewis, Howlin' Wolf, Blind Lemon Jefferson and other legendary Blues musicians.

== Awards ==
- 2003 "Keeping the Blues Alive" award from the Blues Foundation.

== Legacy ==
In 2005, Hunt's 1997 painting "America Cares/the Little Rock Nine" was selected as part of a set of U.S. Postal Service stamps commemorating milestones in the Civil Rights Movement. The image depicts the nine students who became the first African Americans to attend Central High School in Little Rock, Arkansas in 1957 after the Supreme Court declared segregated schools unconstitutional in Brown v. Board of Education. The painting was originally commissioned for the interpretive center at the Little Rock Central High School National Historic Site. Then President Clinton and his first lady asked to hang it in the White House while the interpretation Center was under construction; it remained in the White House for five years until its permanent installation back in Little Rock. The painting in the case as it hangs on the wall is 54.5" tall by 66" wide.

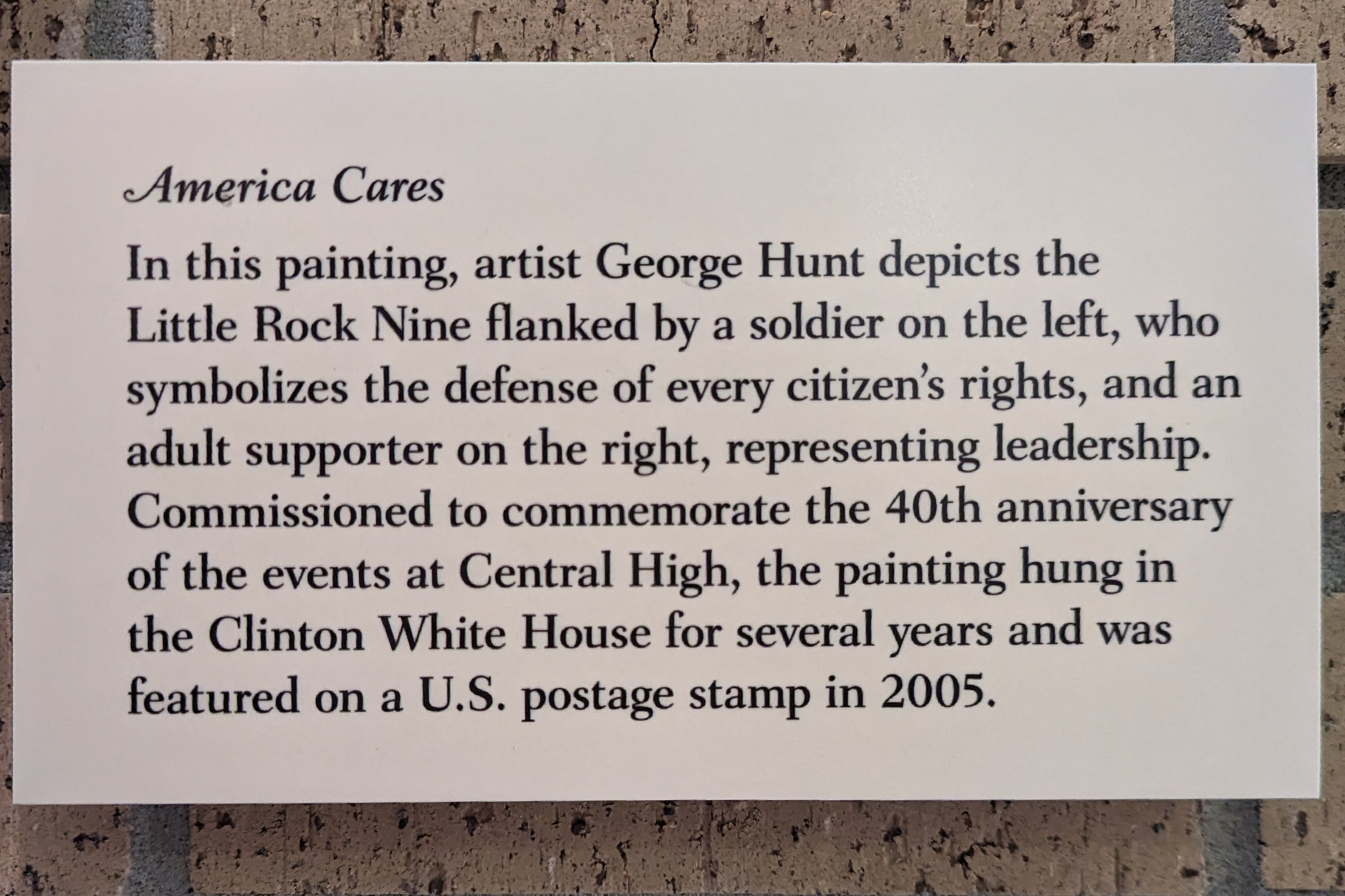
America Cares historic plaque, Central High School National Historic Site

== Works of art ==
Best known works beyond blues musician portraits and many posters for Blues festivals and the Memphis in May Beale Street Music Festival.

- Blues Man (painting)
- Dancin Blues (painting)
- I am a Man (painting)
- America Cares/Little Rock Nine (painting, 1997)

== Selected collections ==
- Gateway to the Blues Museum, Tunica, Mississippi
- October Gallery of Cheyney University, Cheyney, Pennsylvania
- The Melvin Holmes Collection of African American Art, San Francisco, California
- Rock & Roll Hall of Fame, Cleveland, Ohio
- The Museum of Pop Culture, Seattle, Washington

== See also ==
- African-American art
- Cubism
- List of artworks on stamps of the United States
