= Madonna del Sacco (Perugino) =

Painting by Pietro Perugino

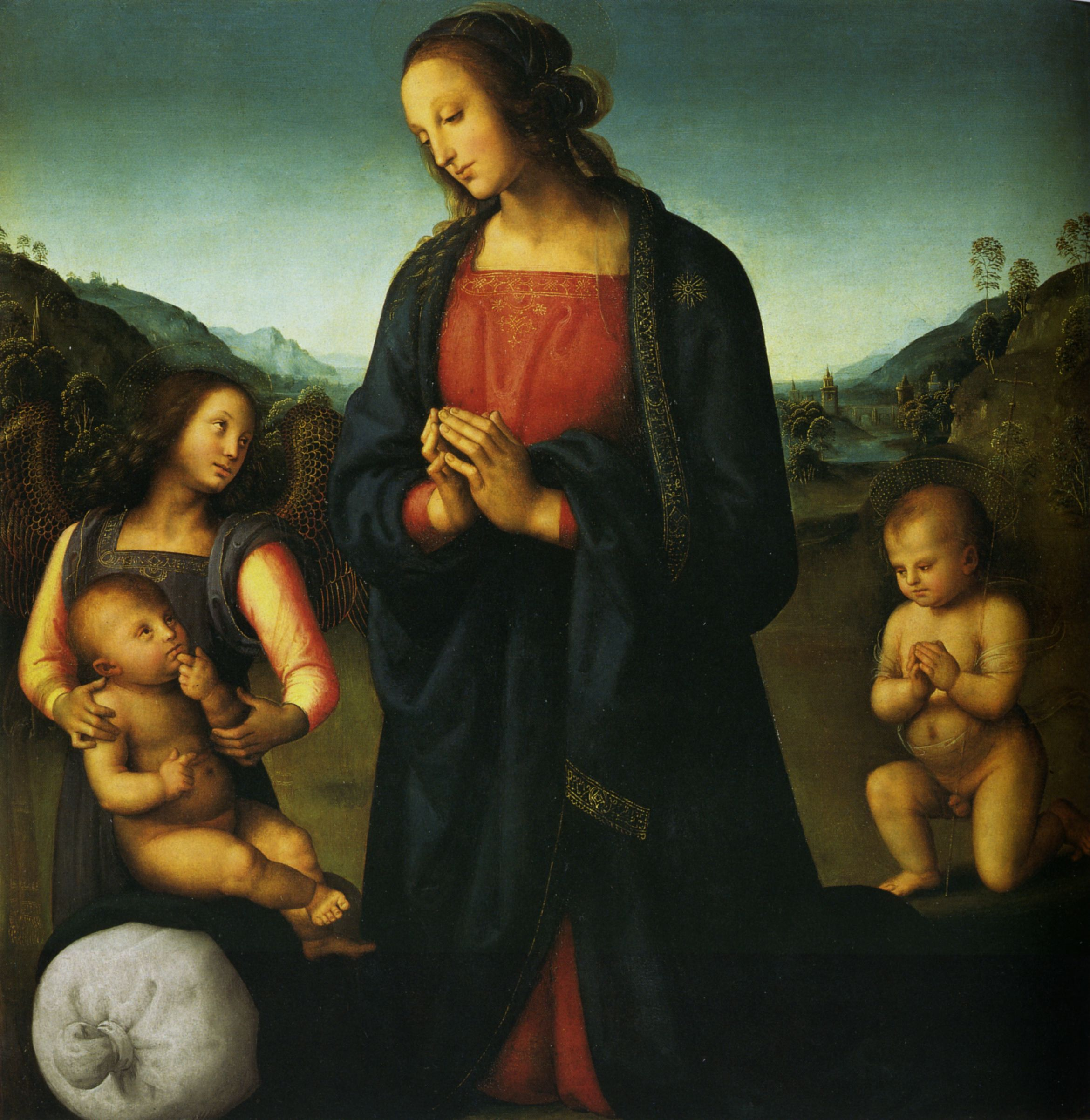
Madonna del Sacco

Madonna del Sacco (literally Madonna of the Bag) is an oil on panel painting by Perugino, dating to around 1495–1500. It shows the Madonna and Child with the infant John the Baptist and an angel. It is now in the Galleria Palatina in Florence.

The figure of Mary is stylistically close to that in the Madonna and Child and the Certosa di Pavia Altarpiece, painted around the same time. She is modelled on Perugino's wife Chiara Fancelli.

== Description and style ==
The Madonna stands in the center of a vast landscape of gentle hills sloping down into the distance, highlighted in gold. Her mantle covers a large white travel bag, on which the Child is seated, supported by an angel. Behind the Virgin, slightly away, St. John's symmetrically balances the scene, in turn kneeling in prayer.

The scene is set according to a calm and pleasant scheme, ordered by the rules of symmetry and rhythmic correspondences, as can be seen in the alternating inclinations of the heads. The Madonna is typical of the painter's mature production, who gave way to the elegant and refined young girl in favor of a more mature, simple and severe woman, in line with the Savonarolian spiritual climate. The chromatic richness, the solid plasticity and the monumentality of the forms now seem to herald the activity of Raphael, the greatest of the painter's pupils.

== Theme ==
The work takes up the recurring representation in Christian painting of the Virgin and Child (or Madonna), presenting the Virgin Mary with the Child Jesus here in the presence of an angel and little Saint John the Baptist.

A particular object present in the representation personalizes the name without the meaning being made explicit. Here the sack would be an allusion to a rampage ("a sack") perpetrated in the city, or to the sack of wheat brought back during the return of the Flight to Egypt.

== Analysis ==
The painting is stylistically close to the effigy of Mary, inspired by that of Chiara Fancelli, the wife of Perugino, other contemporary works such as The Virgin and Child and the Virgin of the Polyptych of the Charterhouse of Pavia.

The red represents the Passion of Christ and the blue the Church. In Our Lady is implied the union of (our mother) the church by the sacrifice of her son.
