= Martín Ramírez =

Mexican artist (1895–1963)

- Born: 30 January 1895; Rincón de Velázquez, Tepatitlán, Jalisco, Mexico
- Died: 17 February 1963 (aged 68)
- Known for: Painting; drawing

Martín Ramírez (January 30, 1895 – February 17, 1963) was a self-taught artist who spent most of his adult life institutionalized in California mental hospitals, diagnosed as a catatonic schizophrenic. He is considered by some to be one of the 20th century's best self-taught masters.

== Biography ==
He was born on January 30, 1895, in Rincón de Velázquez, Tepatitlán, Jalisco, Mexico. He married María Santa Ana Navarro Velázquez in 1918. Ramirez migrated to the United States from Tepatitlan, Mexico to find employment, leaving behind his pregnant wife and three children. He worked on the railroads in California between 1925 and 1930. He knew no English and after six years he ended up unemployed and homeless. This led to him being detained by the police and institutionalized in 1931. He was diagnosed with schizophrenia, leaning towards catatonia. Ramírez spent over 30 years being institutionalized; first at Stockton State Hospital in Stockton, California, then, beginning in 1948, at DeWitt State Hospital in Auburn, near Sacramento, where he made the drawings and collages for which he is now known. At DeWitt, a visiting professor of psychology and art, Tarmo Pasto, came across Ramírez's work and began to save the large-scale works Ramírez made using available materials, including brown paper bags, scraps of examining-table paper, and book pages glued together with a paste made of potatoes and saliva. His works display an idiosyncratic iconography that reflect both Mexican folk traditions and twentieth-century modernization: images of Madonnas, horseback riders, and trains entering and exiting tunnels proliferate in the work, along with undulating fields of concentric lines that describe landscapes, tunnels, theatrical prosceniums, and decorative patterns.

He died in 1963.

== Legacy ==

In the 1970s, artists Jim Nutt and Gladys Nilsson, and art dealer Phyllis Kind bought almost all of Dunievitz's collection. Phyllis Kind presented the first solo show of Martin Ramirez's work in Chicago in 1973. Since his art was introduced into the art market in 1973, Ramírez's drawings and collages have become some of the most highly valued examples of outsider art.

In January 2007, the American Folk Art Museum in New York City opened "Martín Ramírez," the largest retrospective of the artist's work in the United States in more than 20 years. The exhibition featured about 100 of the 300 drawings and collages that had then been known to exist. It was accompanied by a catalog that includes a biographical essay, written by sociologists Víctor M. Espinosa and Kristin E. Espinosa, which discusses many previously unpublished details of Ramírez's life. The exhibition subsequently traveled to the San Jose Museum of Art (June–September 2007) and the Milwaukee Art Museum (October 2007–January 2008).

While the 2007 retrospective, The Last Works, was on view at the American Folk Art Museum, that museum was contacted by descendants of Dr. Max Dunievitz, who served as medical director of DeWitt State Hospital in the early 1960s. Dunievitz had kept approximately 140 of Ramírez's drawings and collages from the last three years of his life; they were nearly discarded by family members upon the doctor's death in 1988. Dunievitz's grandson Phil, having seen the works during childhood visits to his grandfather's house, took them and brought them to his mother's house in Auburn, where they were stored for nearly 20 years in the garage. The heirs of Martín Ramírez challenged the ownership of this group of works, claiming that as the descendants, they deserved an ownership portion of this body of work.

In mediation, the Dunievitz and Ramírez families reached an amicable agreement in 2008, which includes the representation of this work by the Ricco/Maresca Gallery in New York City.

In October and November 2008, a portion of these drawings was concurrently exhibited at the Ricco/Maresca Gallery and the American Folk Art Museum. An accompanying full-color catalog was produced by Roger Ricco and Frank Maresca and published by Pomegranate Communications. It includes essays by Brooke Davis Anderson, Richard Rodriguez, and Wayne Thiebaud.

In December 2013, a lost Madonna by Ramírez was unveiled by the Library of Congress.

In March 2015, "Untitled (Tunnel with Cars and Buses)" (1954), as well as four other designs, were reproduced as a stamp by the United States Postal Service.

His works have sold up to $270,000 in Paris in 2013 and $134,500 in New York in 2011.
