= List of paintings on Soviet postage stamps =

List of paintings on postage stamps of former Soviet Union by title (incomplete as unattributed paintings are not included).

Title	Artist	Year(s)	Year(s) of issue	Value(s), in kopecks or ruble
1919. The Alarm	Kuzma Petrov-Vodkin	1934	1968	10 k.
A Bog in the Forest	Fyodor Vasilyev		1975	10 k.
A Boy With A Dog	Bartolomé Esteban Murillo	1650s	1972	10 k.
A Celebration on the Uritsky Square In Honour of the Opening of the 2nd Komintern Congress	Boris Kustodiyev		1968	30 k.
A Fresh Cavalier	Pavel Fedotov	1846	1976	2 k.
A Girl At Work	Gabriel Metsu		1974	14 k.
A Girl on the Ball	Pablo Picasso		1971	20 k.
A Girl With A Fan	Pierre-Auguste Renoir		1973	20 k.
A Glass of Lemonade	Gerard Terborch		1974	10 k.
A Lady in the Garden	Claude Monet		1973	14 k.
A Letter from the Front	Aleksandr Laktionov	1947	1973	6 k.
A Moor Saddling The Horse	Eugène Delacroix	1855	1972	20 k.
A Morning in the Pine Forest	Ivan Shishkin		1948	60 k.
A Prayer Before Dinner	Jean-Baptiste-Siméon Chardin		1974	16 k.
A Refusal from Confession	Ilya Repin		1969	12 k.
A Rest after the Battle	Yuri Neprintsev		1965	4 k.
A Road in the Birch Forest	Fyodor Vasilyev		1975	4 k.
A Still Life With The Attributes of Art	Jean-Baptiste-Siméon Chardin		1973	12 k.
A View of Odessa by the Moon Night	Ivan Aivazovsky	1846		
A View of the Voskresensk and Nikolsk Gates	Fyodor Alekseyev		1972	20 k.
A Vityaz at the Crossroads	Viktor Vasnetsov	1878	1968	3 k.
A Young Woman Trying On the Ear-Rings	Rembrandt		1973	6 k.
After the Thunderstorm	Fyodor Vasilyev		1975	6 k.
An Ill Woman and A Physician	Jan Steen		1973	10 k.
At the Walk	Pavel Fedotov	1837	1976	16 k.
Au!	Ivan Markichev	1934	1976	4 k.
Do Not Waited For	Ilya Repin		1969	6 k.
Finist the Lucid Falcon	Ivan Bilibin		1969	20 k.
Flora	Rembrandt		1973	50 k.
Glory to Fallen Heroes	Fyodor Bogorodsky	1945	1965	10 k.
Homer (A Workshop)	Gely Korzhev	1960	1968	20 k.
In the Krimean Mountains	Fyodor Vasilyev	1873	1975	12 k.
Lenin	Nikolay Andreyev		1970	4 k.
Lenin at the Map of GOELRO	Leonid Shmatko		1970	4 k.
Madonna With Child Under the Apple Tree	Lucas Cranach the Elder		1983	4 k.
March	Isaak Levitan		1960	40 k.
Marya Morevna	Ivan Bilibin		1969	10 k.
Nicolaus Copernicus	Jan Matejko	1873	1955	1 ruble
On the Approaches to Moscow	Vladimir Bogatkin		1965	3 k.
Penitent Mary Magdalene	Titian		1971	4 k.
Portrait of Apollon Maykov	Fyodor Rokotov		1972	6 k.
Portrait of A Young Man With A Glove	Frans Hals		1971	12 k.
Portrait of Fyodor Volkov	Anton Losenko		1972	4 k.
Portrait of An Old Woman	Rembrandt		1983	4 k.
Portrait of Fyodor Shalyapin	Valentin Serov		1965	6 k.
Portrait of Gavrila Derzhavin	Vladimir Borovikovsky		1972	12 k.
Portrait of Ivan Aivazovsky	Alexey Tyranov	1841	1950	1 ruble
Portrait of Ivan Shishkin	Ivan Kramskoy		1948	30 k.
Portrait of Nikolay Novikov	Dmitry Levitzky		1972	10 k.
Portrait of the Field Hetman				

== See also ==
- List of notable postage stamps
- Stamps of the Soviet Union
- List of artworks on stamps of the United States
