= Frank Maresca (art dealer) =

Frank Maresca (born 1948) is an American dealer of contemporary, self-taught, outsider and 20th-century art. He is a co-founder of Ricco/Maresca Gallery in New York City.

== Early life and career ==
Maresca was born in Brooklyn, New York. He attended the Lafayette High School as a teenager, where he was first exposed to photography and art. After graduation, he attended the Fashion Institute of Technology in Manhattan, where he majored in fashion photography before he received a BFA from the Pratt Institute in Brooklyn. During his time as a student, he was employed as a photographic assistant and studio manager for advertising photographer Irving Schild, and worked alongside some of the most renowned creative directors in the world.

At 21, Maresca opened his own photographic studio, Frank Maresca Studio. He met photo editor John Durniak and began his career as a photojournalist with Time magazine. He worked for Time and Life for three years as a freelancer before returning to his studio to concentrate on fashion and beauty photography—working with clients such as Christian Dior, Almay, Revlon and Elizabeth Arden. He earned numerous art director awards for his advertising images.

He is currently on the advisory committee of The Brooklyn Rail magazine, Intuit: The Center for Intuitive and Outsider Art, and Fountain House. Additionally, he is a former advisory board member of the Newark Museum and the American Folk Art Museum. He is also a board member of Raw Vision magazine.

In 1997, Frank Maresca helped start Fresh Art, a social service organization in New York City that helps provide entrepreneurial opportunities for homeless women.

In 2008, Maresca donated his extensive vernacular photography collection to the Newark Museum in Newark, NJ. The collection became the subject of a major exhibition entitled Now is Then: Snapshots from the Maresca Collection.

=== Outsider and self-taught art ===
An avid supporter of African American art and jazz, Maresca began a collection of folk and self-taught art after seeing the exhibition Folk Sculpture USA at the Brooklyn Museum in 1976. His admiration for folk and American tribal art lead directly to an interest in what is popularly known today as outsider art. Subsequently, Maresca made the transition from collector to art dealer.

In 1979, Maresca and his business partner Roger Ricco founded Ricco/Maresca Gallery on Broome Street in New York's then-emerging SoHo gallery district. The gallery relocated to TriBeCa in the 1980s, then later moved to Wooster Street in SoHo, which by then had become a well-developed center for contemporary art galleries.

In 1997, Ricco/Maresca was one of the first galleries to establish in the new Chelsea art district. The gallery is currently located at 529 West 20th Street.

Ricco/Maresca has championed and showcased the art of self-taught masters working outside the art-historical mainstream. The gallery focuses both on significant contemporary art in diverse media and historically important American art of the 20th century. Through the gallery, Maresca has established an international reputation for assisting important clients and museums in the acquisition of artworks and collection building, as well as exhibition design and lecturing on topics ranging from the art market to outsider, self-taught, and folk art.

== Published works ==
- Black Dolls (Radius Books, 2015)
- Now Is Then: Snapshots from the Maresca Collection (Princeton Architectural Press/The Newark Museum, 2008)
- Martin Ramirez: The Last Works (Pomegranate, 2008)
- Nijinsky: A Dance with Madness (Ricco/Maresca, 2006)
- American Vernacular: New Discoveries in Folk, Self-Taught, and Outsider Sculpture (Little, Brown and Company, 2002)
- The Intuitive Eye (Ricco/Maresca, 2000)
- Self-Taught Outsider Art Brut (Ricco/Maresca, 1998)
- William Hawkins: Paintings (Alfred A. Knopf, 1997)
- Bill Traylor: Observing Life (Ricco/Maresca, 1997)
- Ray Gun (FotoFolio, 1999)
- American Self-Taught (Alfred A. Knopf, 1993)
- Bill Traylor: His Art, His Life (Alfred A. Knopf, 1991)
- American Primitive (Alfred A. Knopf, 1988)
- A Certain Style (Alfred A. Knopf, 1988)
