= Madonna and Child (Perugino, Washington) =

Painting by Perugino

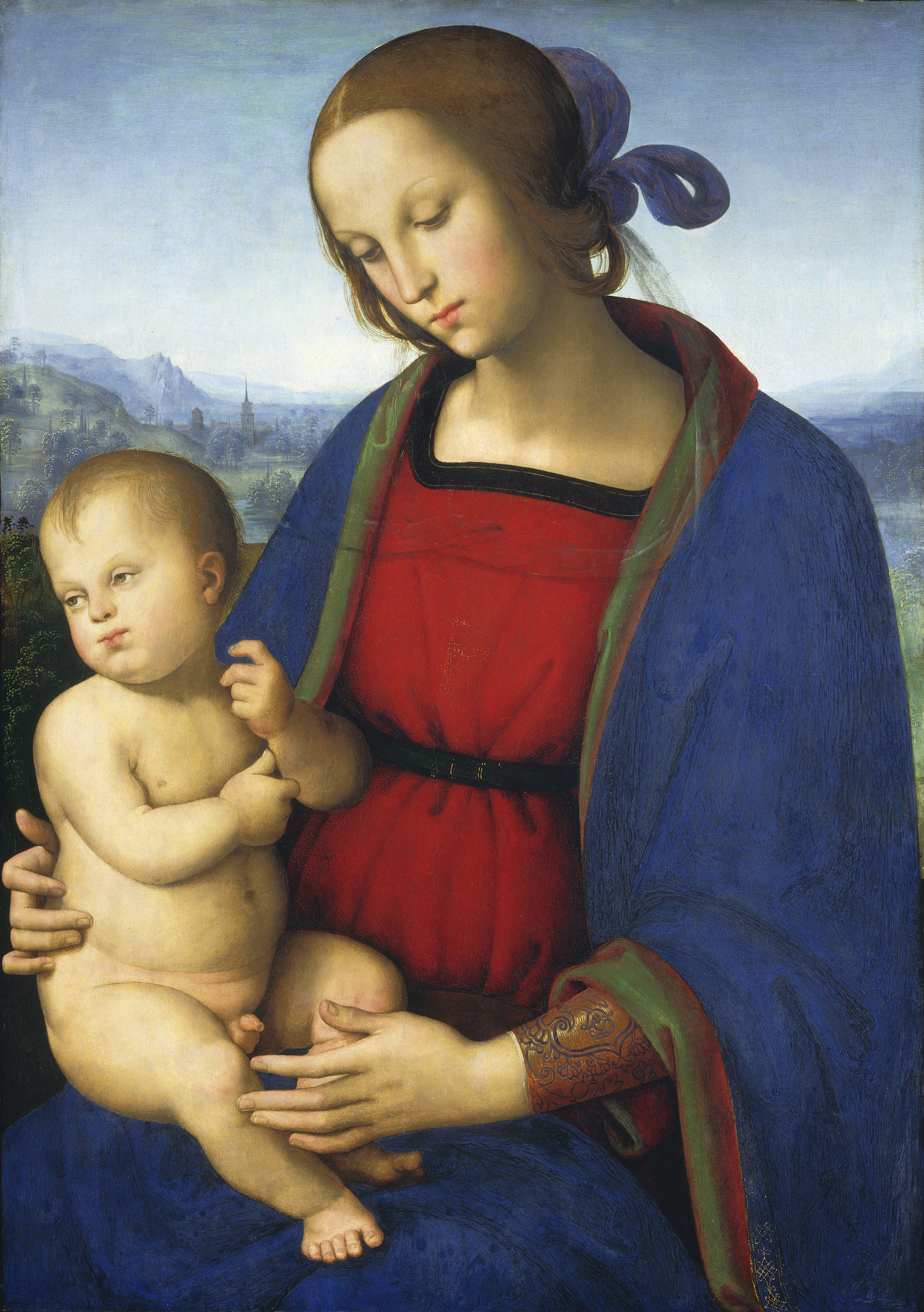
- Artist: Perugino
- Year: c.1501
- Medium: oil on panel
- Dimensions: 70.2 cm × 50 cm (27.6 in × 20 in)
- Location: National Gallery of Art, Washington, D.C.

Madonna and Child is an oil on oak panel painting by Perugino. It dates to around 1501 and is now in the National Gallery of Art in Washington.

== Bibliography ==
- (in Italian) Vittoria Garibaldi, Perugino, in Pittori del Rinascimento, Scala, Florence, 2004 ISBN 888117099X
- (in Italian) Pierluigi De Vecchi, Elda Cerchiari, I tempi dell'arte, volume 2, Bompiani, Milan, 1999. ISBN 88-451-7212-0
- (in Italian) Stefano Zuffi, Il Quattrocento, Electa, Milan, 2004. ISBN 8837023154
