= Emilio Sanchez (artist) =

American painter (1921–1999)

- Born: Emilio Sánchez Fonts; 1921; Camagüey, Cuba
- Died: 1999 (aged 77–78)
- Known for: Painting, Printmaking, Drawing
- Movement: American Modernist
- Awards: First Prize, 1974 San Juan Biennial (Puerto Rico)
- Website: Emilio Sanchez Foundation

Emilio Sanchez (1921–1999) was an American artist known for his architectural paintings and graphic lithographs. His work is held in the permanent collections of the Metropolitan Museum of Art (New York NY), Museum of Modern Art (New York NY), National Gallery of Art (Washington DC), Smithsonian American Art Museum (Washington DC), Museo Nacional de Bellas Artes de La Habana (Havana, Cuba), Museo de Arte de Ponce (Ponce, Puerto Rico), Bogotá Museum of Modern Art (Bogotá, Colombia), La Tertulia Museum (Cali, Colombia), and the National Gallery of Australia (Canberra, Australia).

A representational artist with a modernist and, at times, abstract approach, Sanchez emphasized "pattern, color and strong lighting contrasts". By 1970, architectural themes, from detailed stained glass windows to abstracted storefronts or city skylines, dominated his oeuvre. Carol Damian of the Frost Art Museum (Miami, FL) described his work as studies in "horizontals and verticals, bold stripes of color, and the ever-present shadows, especially diagonal shadows that he so favored, with darks and lights in repetition." For her, Sanchez's work was "not a picture of something, but the application of pigment onto a flat surface to become a singular object to its own definition."

== Early life ==
Emilio Sánchez Fonts was born in Camagüey, Cuba, in 1921, to Estrella Fonts and Emilio Sánchez. The grandson of sugar entrepreneur Bernabé Sánchez Adan and a member of one of Cuba's oldest and wealthiest families, Sanchez's early life was one of privilege. As a child, he was tutored at home on his father's sugar plantation in central Cuba, where he was encouraged to draw by his grandmother. He traveled extensively throughout Europe and North and South America, and as a youth, attended the American boarding schools Ransom Everglades School, Fessenden School and, from 1935–39, The Choate School, now Choate Rosemary Hall.

After his parents divorced, his mother married Peruvian artist Felipe Cossío del Pomar in 1938 and moved to San Miguel de Allende, Mexico. Sánchez then divided his time between Mexico, his father's Cuban estate, and American schools. He attended Yale University and, from 1941–1943, the University of Virginia.

Encouraged to pursue art by Cossío del Pomar, Sánchez moved to New York City in 1944 to attend the Art Students League. He later studied watercolor painting under Dong Kingman at Columbia University School of the Arts. During the late 1940s, he developed an interest in Mexican colonial architecture as well as Pre-Columbian Art and illustrated two books on Peruvian Art written by Cossío del Pomar.

In 1949, his first solo exhibition was held at Joseph Luyber Gallery in New York City, followed by solo shows in 1951 at Ferargil Gallery in New York and Ateneo Español in Mexico City. Although he moved permanently to New York City in 1952, Sánchez continued to visit the Caribbean, where he often photographed scenes as references for his art. In the mid-1950s, he began experimenting with printmaking techniques such as lithography, woodcut, and aquatint.

== Career ==
In 1956, Sanchez's solo watercolor exhibition at Peridot Gallery (New York NY) of figurative New York or Caribbean street scenes was reviewed favorably by Stuart Preston of The New York Times. His 1956 solo show at El Lyceum (Havana, Cuba) led to his association with Galeria Cubana de Pintura y Escultura and group exhibitions in Venezuela and Columbia. In 1958, his solo show at Galerie Sudamerica (New York NY) was noted by Cuban critics. In 1959, he exhibited lithographs at the Havana Salón anual: Pintura, Escultura y Grabado and his first print solo exhibition Obras Gráficas, held at El Lyceum, was well received by the public and press. Although Sanchez did not return to Cuba after 1960, he continued to exhibit in biennials throughout Central and South America. At this time solo exhibitions of his work were held in San Juan, Puerto Rico, and Madrid, Spain, as well as in Houston, New Orleans, and New York. In 1968, Sanchez became an American citizen. He also signed with the renown Associated American Artists (New York NY) which held solo exhibitions of his work in 1968, in 1971 and 1981.

Although Sanchez continually explored a variety of subjects including fruit, flowers, clotheslines, sailboats, and sunsets, by 1971, architectural themes, such as the arched doorways of the Medio Punto oil paintings, emerged as his signature subject. At this time solo exhibitions of his work were held throughout Latin America at the Museo Bellas Artes (Caracas, Venezuela), La Tertulia Museum (Cali, Colombia), Museo de Arte de Ponce (Ponce, Puerto Rico), as well as the Center for Inter-American Relations (New York NY). During the 1970s, frequent trips to the Mediterranean inspired Sanchez to adopt a more geometric and minimalist approach in his Moroccan paintings or Boston City Hall drawings. Sanchez also created drawings with themes of eroticism, gender, and LGBTQ+ themes. Sanchez was gay and closeted for the duration of his career.

By the late 1980s, he turned his attention to New York scenes and depicted Bronx bodegas, storefronts, and garages as solid blocks of color. During this time he exhibited at the Museum of Art Fort Lauderdale and the Miami-Dade Public Library in Florida as well as at galleries in Fort Lauderdale, Boca Raton and Coral Gables, and in Miami, home to many exiled Cubans. Although Sanchez increasingly experienced vision problems, he continued to paint until his death in Warwick, New York, in 1999.

Since his death, solo exhibitions of Sanchez's work were noted at the Bronx Museum in 2001; at Boston City Hall in 2009; and at Syracuse University Art Galleries in 2011. Exhibitions of his work were held in 2012 at Saint Joseph College (Hartford CA), and the University of Virginia's Fralin Museum of Art, as well as in 2013 at the University of Oregon's Museum of Art, the University of Michigan, Indiana University, and the Museo de Arte de Ponce (Ponce, Puerto Rico).

== Recognition and contribution ==
Sanchez's paintings and prints drew the attention of both the public and critics as early as 1958. In 1967, he was interviewed for the series Listening with Pictures by Arlene Jacobowitz, Assistant Curator of Paintings and Sculpture of the Brooklyn Museum of Art. He was also recognized internationally and was awarded first prize at the 1974 Biennial in San Juan, Puerto Rico. During his career, his critical supporters included American art collector Barbara Duncan and A Hyatt Mayor, print curator at the Metropolitan Museum in New York.

In style and subject matter Sanchez's work reflected both Latin-American and American culture. His colorful Caribbean palette and interest in light and shadow on vernacular architecture is attributed to his formative years in Cuba. Although his flat, sometimes abstract, geometric style was not unlike his Brazilian contemporaries Alfredo Volpi and Livio Abramo, his paintings evoked a sense of place that, for art historian Rafael DíazCasas, reflected a "feeling of displacement" and "idea of an absent household". Although Sanchez's work is important within American Hispanic art, his work is also in the tradition of American painters Edward Hopper and Georgia O'Keeffe. For art historian John Angeline, his work also evoked the paintings of Charles Sheeler and extended "Precisionism a step further." Composed with "a photographer's eye", Sanchez's New York scenes recalled Berenice Abbott's urban photographs or Judith Turner's architectural abstractions. Aesthetically versatile, Sanchez's "modernist investigations" are also linked to the Pop art imagery of Andy Warhol or Jasper Johns, or can be categorized as Camp (style). For Angeline, Sanchez assimilated and appreciated "the different styles and artistic choices surrounding him while maintaining his own voice."

In 2021, on the centennial anniversary of Sanchez's birth, the United States Postal Service released a series of postage stamps featuring four of his works: Los Toldos (1973), Ty’s Place (1976), En el Souk (1972) and Untitled (Ventanita entreabierta) (1981).

== Public collections ==
Sanchez's work is found in many museum collections, most notably the Metropolitan Museum of Art (New York NY) which has 200 drawings or prints. His work is also found in the collections of the Perez Art Museum Miami (Miami FL), Museum of Modern Art (New York NY), the New York Public Library (New York NY), Brooklyn Museum (Brooklyn NY), El Museo del Barrio, National Gallery of Art (Washington, DC), Smithsonian American Art Museum (Washington DC), Art Museum of the Americas (Washington, DC), Museum of Fine Arts, Boston (Boston MA), Munson-Williams-Proctor Arts Institute (Utica NY), Fine Arts Museum of San Francisco (San Francisco CA), Museum of Fine Arts Houston (Houston TX), Museo Nacional de Bellas Artes (Havana, Cuba), Museo de Arte de Ponce (Ponce PR), Museo de Bellas Artes (Caracas, Venezuela), Museo de Arte Moderno Bogotá (Bogotá, Colombia), Museo de Arte Moderno de Cartagena (Cartagena Colombia), La Tertulia Museum (Cali, Colombia), and at the National Gallery of Australia (Canberra, Australia). His work is also found in the university collections of the New York Law School, Ursinus College, University of Michigan, Muscarelle Museum of Art, Indiana University and Kinsey Institute, University of Wyoming, University of Notre Dame, Southern Illinois University, University of Virginia, Syracuse University, Caribbean University (Bayamón, PR), and at the Universidad del Turabo. Sanchez's original papers as well as a digital database of his work (5486 images and 614 text documents such as letters, press releases or reviews), compiled by the Emilio Sanchez Foundation, are located at the Smithsonian's Archives of American Art (Washington DC). A small archive of Sanchez's documents or source materials including photographs are archived at the Miami-Dade Public Library.

== Emilio Sanchez Foundation ==
In his will Sanchez stipulated that a foundation be established to support contemporary artists or ophthalmic research as well as promote and distribute his remaining work. Officially established in 2005, the Foundation funded the Emilio Sanchez Award in the Visual Arts, awarded in association with the Cintas Foundation annually from 2005 to 2009. The Foundation also contributed to the Cuban Artist Fund, El Museo del Barrio, the Bronx Museum of the Arts, the Storefront for Art and Architecture, and the Museum of Latin American Art (Long Beach CA). From 2005 to 2012, the Foundation distributed over 4,000 of the artist's 7,000 prints or paintings to 72 institutions in the United States, Cuba and Puerto Rico, while the remainder were sold or are currently on sale. In 2011, the Foundation published Hard Light: The Work of Emilio Sanchez, edited by Curator Ann Koll, which included essays by John Angeline, Rudi C. Bleys, and Rafael DiazCasas. Although the Foundation closed its studio space on 19 West 21st Street In February 2012, it continues to maintain an online presence.

Images in Public Collections
- Jamaican Women 1956 lithograph. Museum of Modern Art, New York NY
- La Regata [The regatta] 1981 lithograph. National Gallery of Australia. Canberra, Australia
- El Hotel Miramar 1981 lithograph. National Gallery of Australia, Canberra, Australia
- Casita al Mar [Small house by the sea] 1974 lithograph, National Gallery of Australia, Canberra, Australia
- Ty's Place 1976 lithograph. National Gallery of Australia, Canberra, Australia
- The Garden Wall c.1974 lithograph. Art Museum of the Americas, Washington DC
- San Juan de Noche Lithograph Brooklyn Museum, Brooklyn NY
- Casita Azul Y Naranja Lithograph Brooklyn Museum, Brooklyn NY
- Untitled, Bronx Storefront, "La Rumba Supermarket c.1980s Watercolor Smithsonian American Art Museum, Washington DC
- Untitled, Cuban Flag Abstraction c.1970s Oil and pencil on canvas Smithsonian American Art Museum, Washington DC
- Blue Shutters 1975 Lithograph Hirshhorn Museum and Sculpture Garden, Smithsonian Institution, Washington DC
- Seven Lithographs National Gallery of Art, Washington DC
Museum and Public Exhibitions
- Indiana University, Bloomington IN, 2013
- Palitz Gallery, Syracuse University, New York NY, 2012
- The Schingoethe Art Gallery, Aurora University, Aurora IL, 2012
- University of Virginia Art Museum, Charlottesville VA, 2012
- Museo de Arte de Ponce, Ponce PR, 2012
- Saint Joseph College Art Gallery, West Hartford CT, 2012
- Syracuse University Art Galleries, Syracuse NY, 2011
- The Bronx Museum of the Arts, New York NY, 2010
- Lehigh University Galleries, Bethlemhem PA, 2010
- Snite Museum of Art, Notre Dame IN, 2010
- Boston City Hall, Scollay Square Gallery, Boston MA, 2009
- Miami-Dade Public Library, Main Library, Miami FL, 2005
- The Paul Mellon Arts Center, Wallingford CT, 2004
- Miami-Dade Community College, Kendall FL, 1992
- Miami-Dade Public Library, Miami FL, 1988
- Museum of Art, Fort Lauderdale FL, 1985
- Museo la Tertulia, Cali, Colombia, 1982
- Williams College Museum of Art, Williamstown MA, 1978
- Miami-Dade Public Library Print Show, Miami FL, 1977
- Museo Ponce, Puerto Rico, 1976
- Museo la Tertulia, Cali, Colombia, 1974
- Museo del Grabado Latinoamericano, San Juan PR, 1974
- Biblioteca Luis-Angel Arango, Bogotá, Colombia, 1972
- Center for Inter-American Relations, New York NY, 1971
- Museo de Bellas Artes, Caracas, Venezuela, 1971
- Philadelphia Print Club, Philadelphia PA, 1958
- Mint Museum, Charlotte NC, 1955
