= Robert Zünd =

Swiss landscape painter (1827–1909)

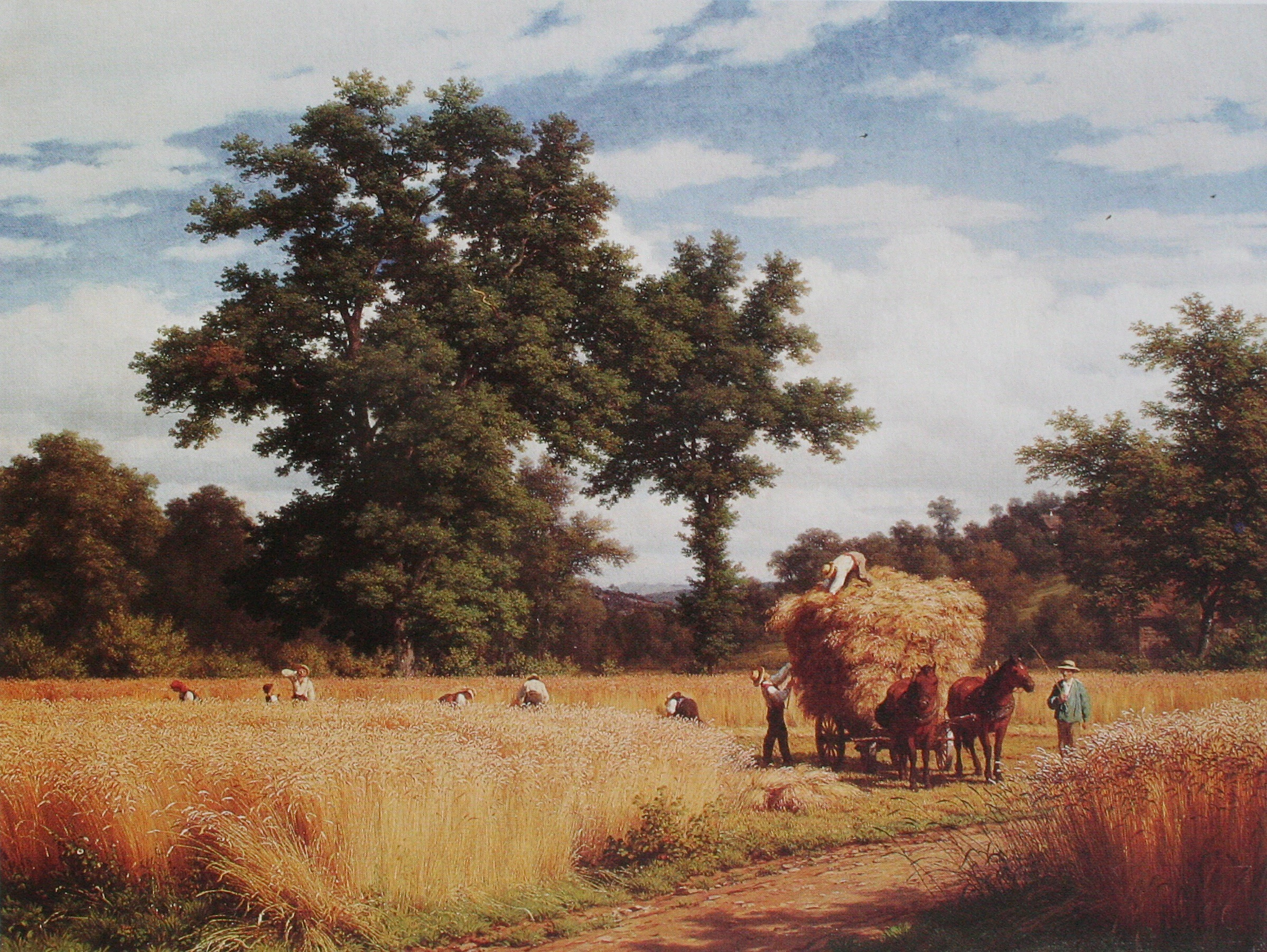
Cornfield with Oaks

Robert Zünd (3 May 1827, Lucerne – 15 January 1909, Lucerne) was a Swiss landscape painter.

== Life ==
Zünd came from a middle-class family. After attending high school in his home town, he was taught drawing and painting in the studios of Jakob Schwegler (1793–1866). In 1848, at the suggestion of Joseph Zelger (1812–1885), a landscape painter from Nidwalden, he moved to Geneva, where he was initially taught by François Diday then by Diday's student Alexandre Calame.

In the spring of 1851, he met Rudolf Koller and they became good friends. After an unsuccessful attempt to create a local artists' association, they left Geneva.

In 1852 Zünd traveled to Paris. At the Louvre, he studied the works of the Dutch and French masters of the 17th Century. His first major work was The Harvest (1860), now in the Kunstmuseum Basel. That same year, he copied works by Claude Lorrain, Ruisdael, and Paulus Potter in the Gemälde Gallery, Dresden.

In 1863, he settled on the outskirts of Lucerne, and rarely left for any extended period of time after that. Between 1867 and 1877, his religious faith began to appear as biblical motifs in his pictures, such as The Road to Emmaus (1877).

In 1882 he completed Der Eichenwald (The Oak Forest), one of his best known works. The image was based on an earlier study and a smaller 1859 version. Gottfried Keller visited Zünd's humble art studio while pursuing his interest in art and was impressed by what he saw, declaring that it approached the true ideal landscape. The painting was exhibited in Zürich at the Schweizerische Landesausstellung of 1883. Today the picture is owned by the Kunsthaus Zürich. In 1889, he and Koller traveled together to the Internationale Kunstausstellung (International Art Exhibition) in Munich.

In 1906, the University of Zürich awarded him an honorary doctorate, and a street in Lucerne is named after him.

== Style ==
Zünd's art is distinguished by a special closeness to nature and his highly naturalistic, richly detailed style of painting. His passions were mainly for idyllic landscapes around Lucerne. He avoided depicting modern facilities such as buildings and railways. His landscapes are generally arranged according to classical composition theory.

== Selected works ==
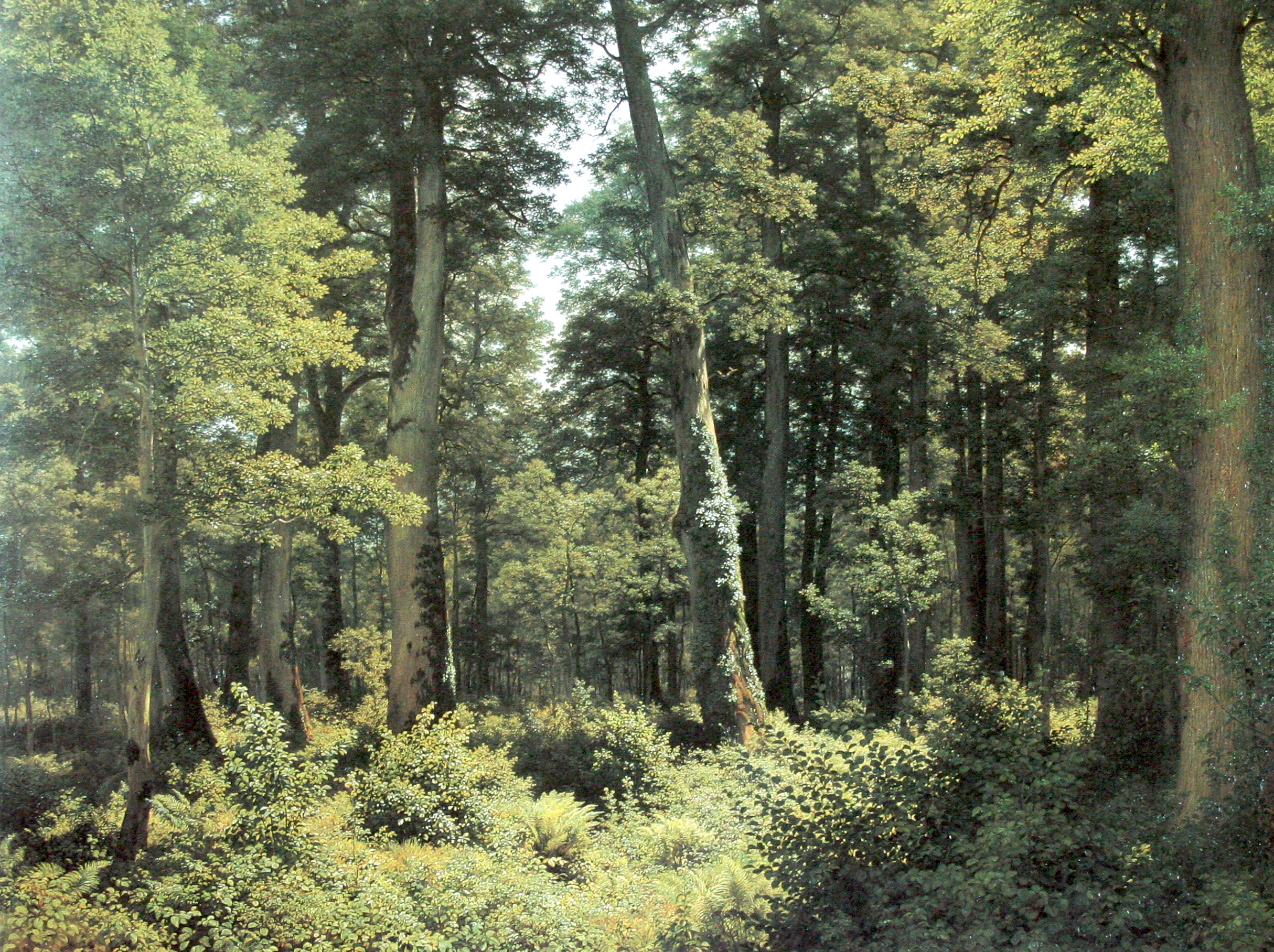
Oak Forest

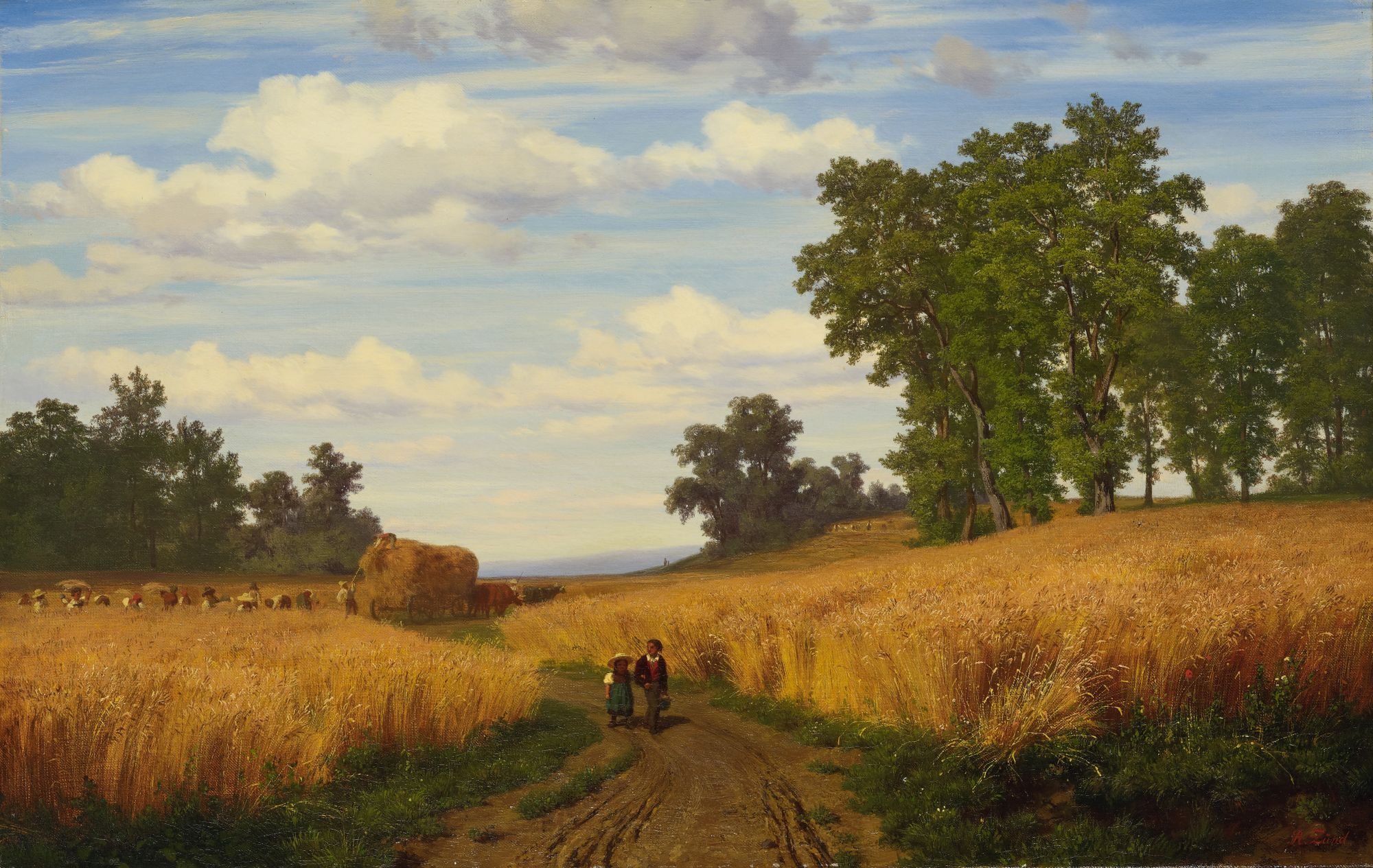
The Harvest

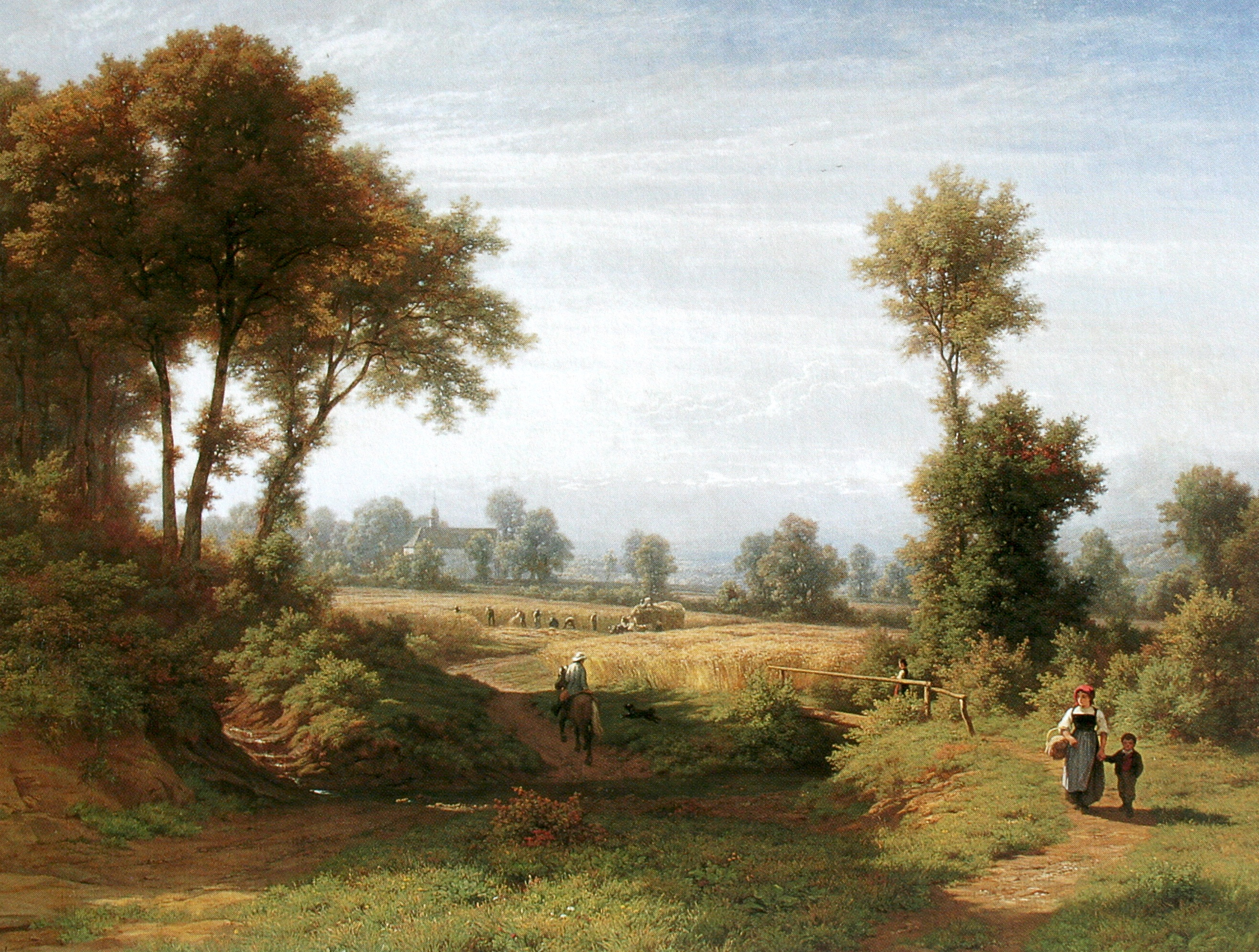
Near the Schlachtkapelle in Sempach

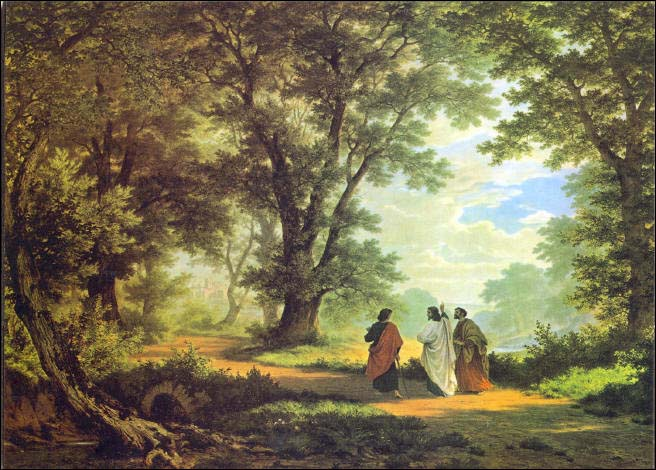
The Way to Emmaus

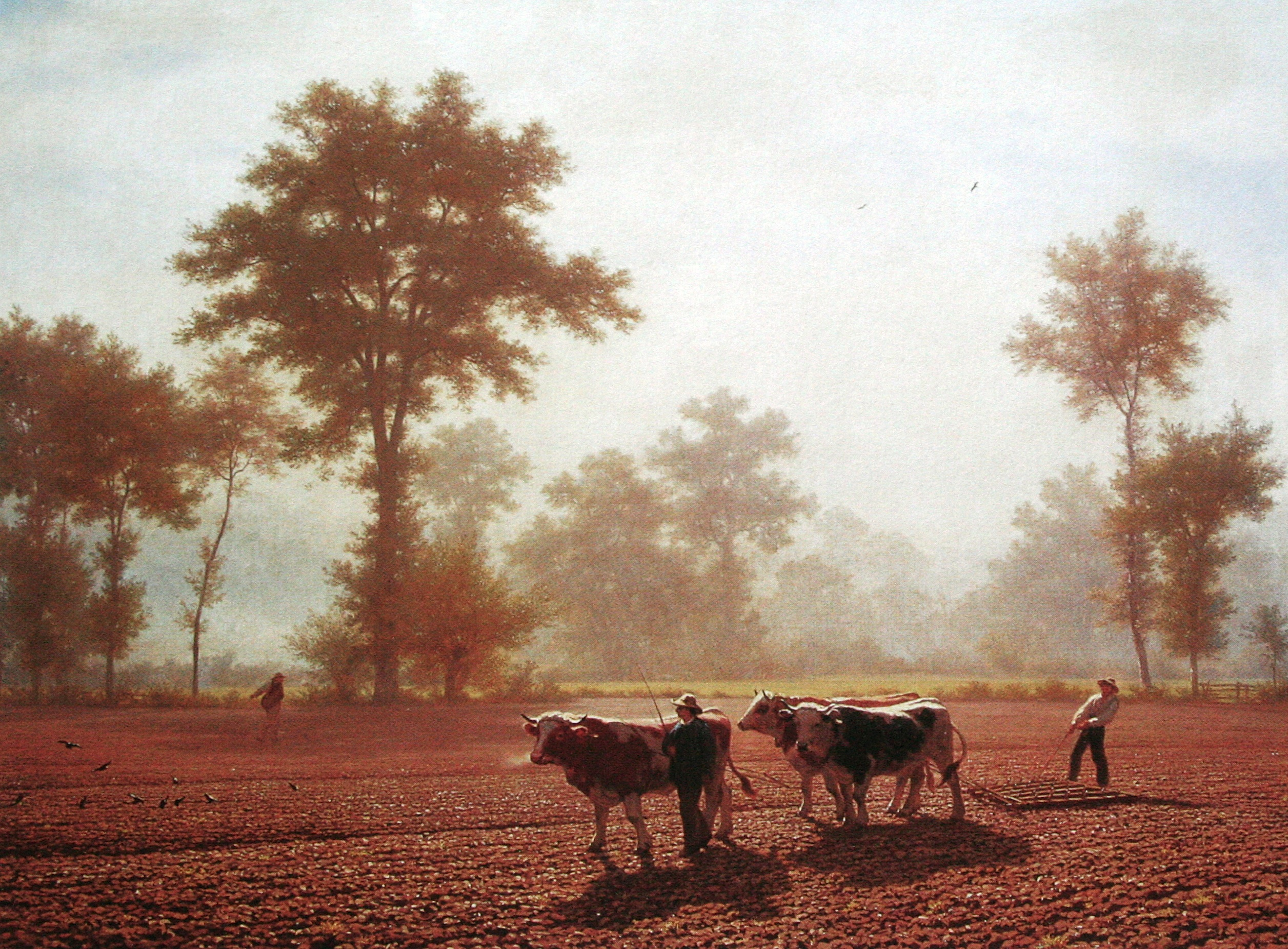
Ox Team in Valais

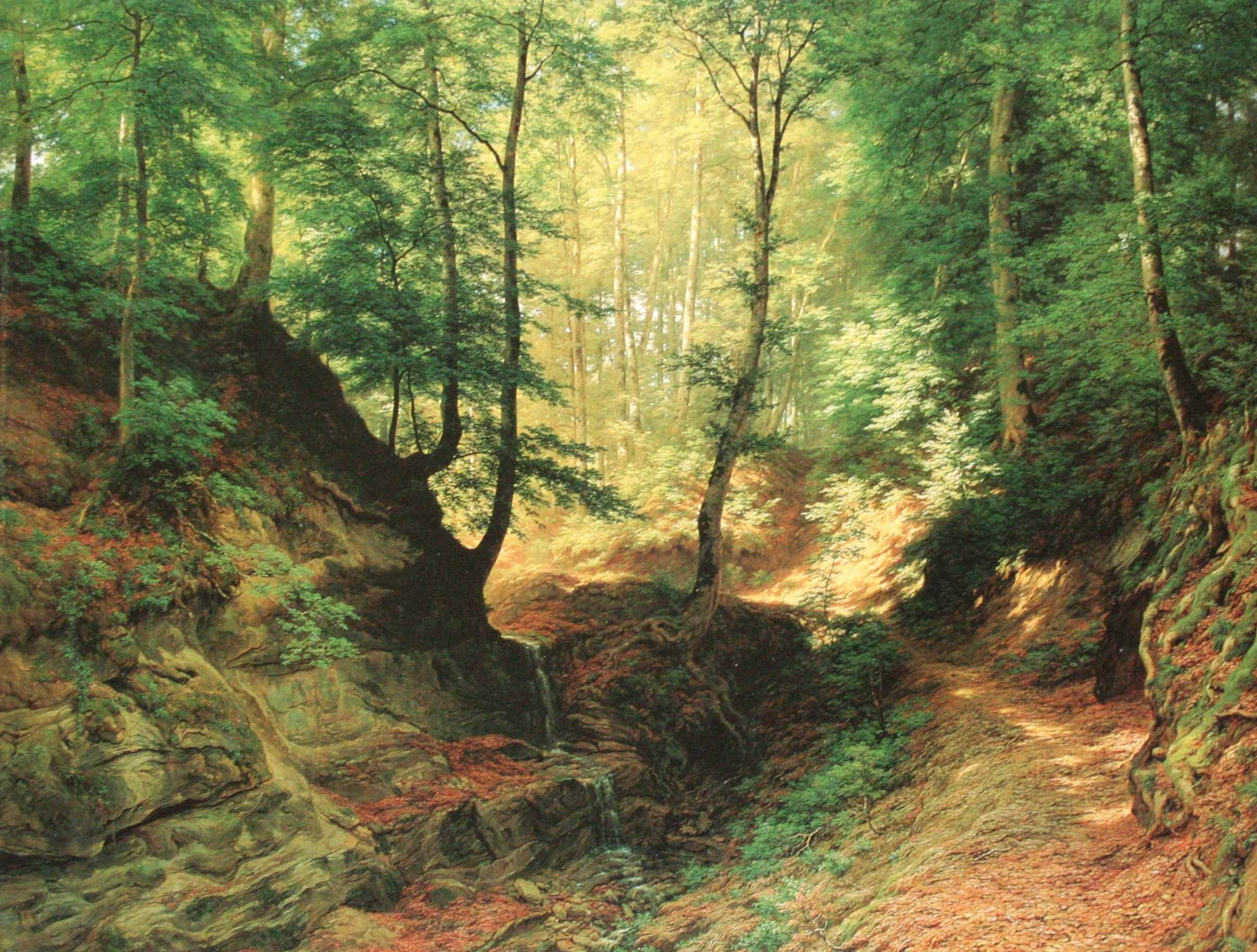
Beech Wood
