= Mountainous Landscape with a Torrent =

Painting by Jacob van Ruisdael

- French: Paysage montagneux avec torrent
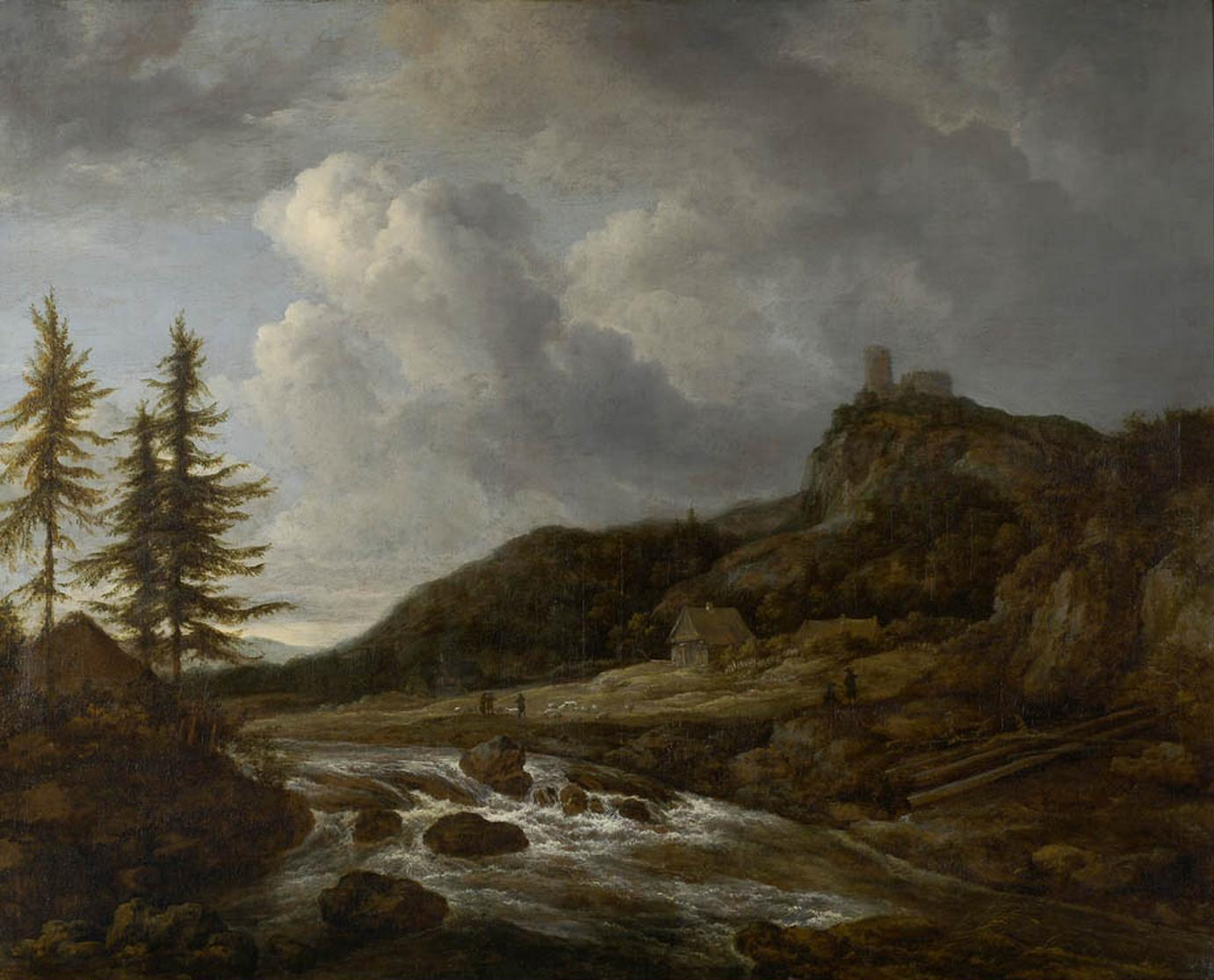
- Artist: Jacob van Ruisdael
- Completion date: early 1670s
- Medium: oil painting on canvas
- Movement: Dutch Golden Age painting Landscape painting
- Dimensions: 92 cm × 115 cm (36 in × 45 in)
- Location: Musée des Beaux-Arts, Strasbourg
- Accession: 1911

Mountainous Landscape with a Torrent is an early 1670s landscape painting by the Dutch painter Jacob van Ruisdael. It is now in the Musée des Beaux-Arts of Strasbourg, France. Its inventory number is 619.

The painting was bought in 1911 in Berlin from Thomas Agnew & Sons by Wilhelm von Bode with a fund from the legacy of the publisher and patron of the museum, Karl Trübner. The subject Ruisdael depicted – a dramatic landscape with "Nordic" (Scandinavian) elements and a castle on a hill, not found as such in the Low Countries – is inspired by works of Allaert van Everdingen, such as the imposing Nordic Landscape with a Castle on a Hill (also in the Musée des Beaux-Arts de Strasbourg).

== See also ==
- List of paintings by Jacob van Ruisdael
