= Three Angels and Young Tobias =

Painting by Filippino Lippi

Three Archangels and Young Tobias
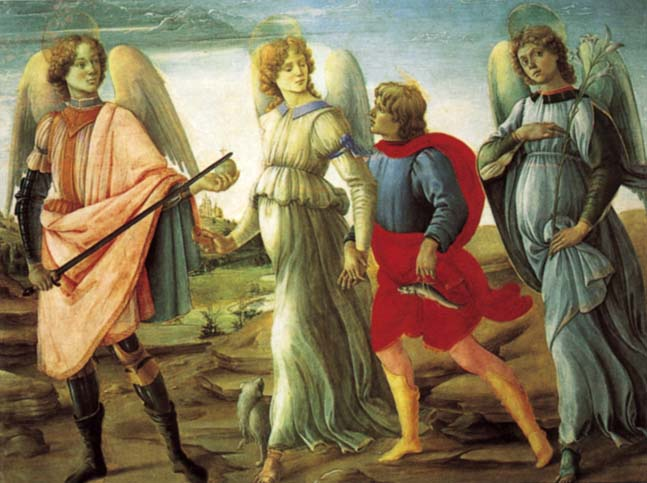
- Artist: Filippino Lippi
- Year: c. 1485
- Medium: Oil on panel
- Dimensions: 100 cm × 127 cm (39 in × 50 in)
- Location: Galleria Sabauda, Turin

Three Archangels with Young Tobias is a painting by the Italian Renaissance painter Filippino Lippi, dated c. 1485. It is housed in the Galleria Sabauda of Turin.

On the background of a rocky landscape, resembling that of the London Adoration of the Magi, the picture represents the three archangels: Michael on the left, Raphael in the centre, and Gabriel holding a lily, together with a young Tobias, son of Tobit. The scene is clearly inspired by a Voyage of Tobias by Francesco Botticini, once in the Florentine church of Florence and now in the Uffizi, while the angels resemble those painted by Filippino himself in the Liberation of St. Peter in the Brancacci Chapel.

The work was once attributed to Sandro Botticelli or his workshop.

== See also ==
- Tobias and the Angel (disambiguation)
