= Tobias and the Angel (Filippino Lippi) =

Painting by Filippino Lippi

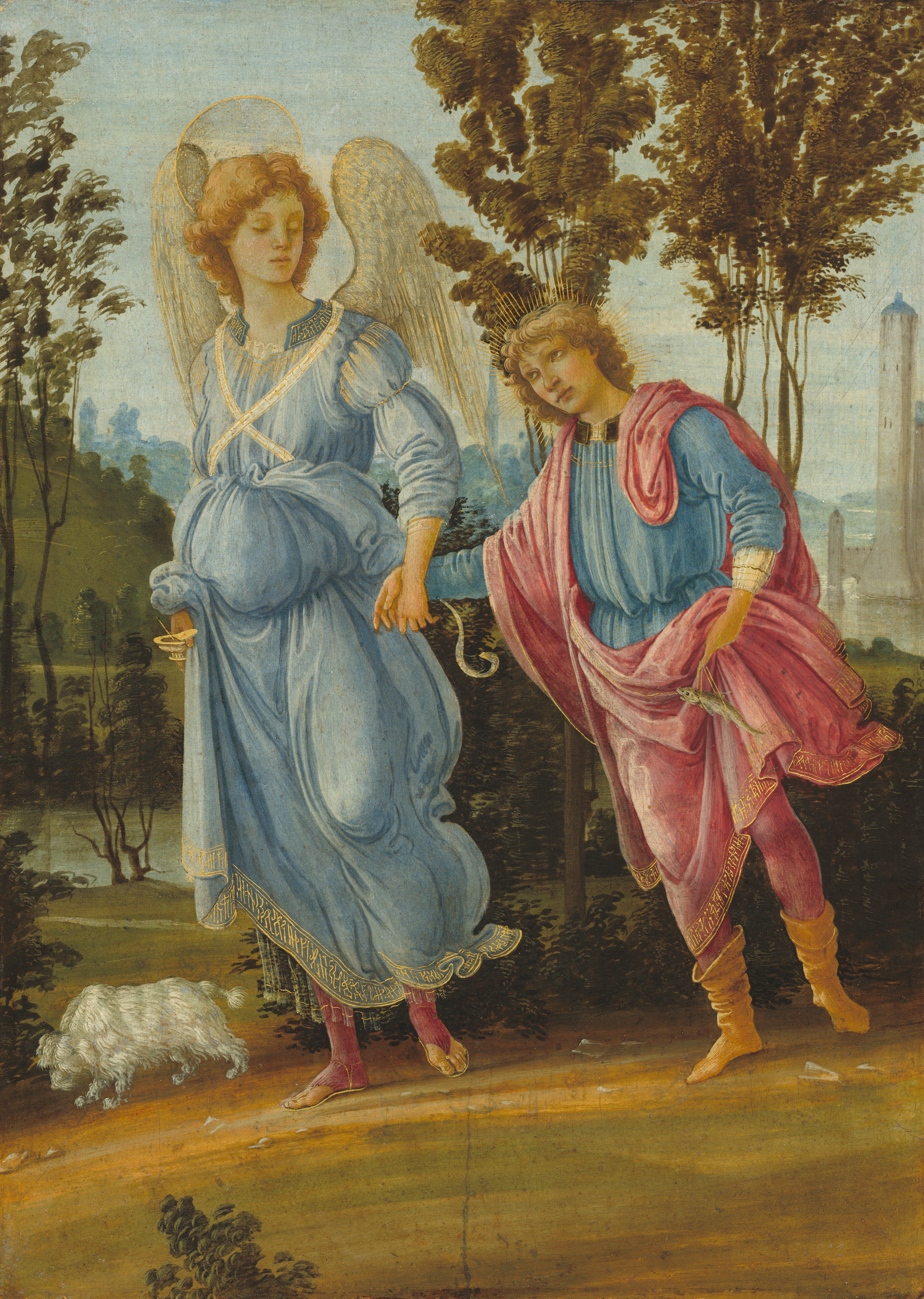
- Artist: Filippino Lippi
- Year: c. 1475–1480
- Type: Oil and tempera on panel
- Dimensions: 32.7 cm × 23.5 cm (12.9 in × 9.3 in)
- Location: National Gallery of Art; Washington

Tobias and the Angel is an oil and tempera painting on poplar panel by the Florentine Renaissance painter Filippino Lippi, dating from c. 1475–1480, of Tobias and the Angel, a popular subject at the time. It is now in the National Gallery of Art in Washington, DC.

== Description ==
The work, in oil paint and tempera on a poplar panel, measures 32.7 cm × 23.5 cm (12.9 in × 9.3 in). It depicts a biblical scene of Tobias and Raphael. In the Book of Tobit, Tobias, son of the blinded Tobit, was sent from Nineveh to Ecbatana to collect a debt. The archangel Raphael, disguised as the human Azariah, was sent to accompany Tobias on his errand. On the journey, the angel will advise Tobias to catch a fish from the River Tigris and then to create remedy for his father's blindness using the fish's gall.

The two main figures are depicted walking through a landscape, accompanied by a white dog, with trees and a river, and a tall tower to the right. They are arm in arm, their blond heads inclined towards each other, with their slightly unstable posture indicating they are walking. The winged Raphael in a blue gown and Tobias in a blue tunic with red cloak. The boy holds the fish in his left hand, and the angel holds a small golden mortar to make the remedy in his right hand.

The subject of Tobias and the Angel was popular with the wealthy merchants of Renaissance Florence, combining themes of the recovery of debts, the healing of the sick, a youth taking good advice from his elders and developing into adulthood, and Christ (the fish) and baptism (the waters of the Tigris). It also had resonances with the common experience of merchants' sons being sent on trading missions to distant locations.

== History ==
Trained initially by his father Filippo Lippi, after his father's death Filippino Lippi became a pupil of Sandro Botticelli in 1472. This painting is an early work, with a similar composition to earlier works by Antonio del Pollaiuolo and Andrea del Verrocchio. A later painting by Filippino Lippi, his c. 1485 Three Angels and Young Tobias, in the Galleria Sabauda in Turin, depicts a similar scene, with Tobias accompanied by the archangels Raphael, Michael, and Gabriel.

The early history of the painting is not known. It was sold from the collection of Alexander Barker in 1879, and passed through the collections of William Cornwallis-West, and Robert Henry Benson. The Benson Collection was sold to Duveen Brothers in 1927, and the painting was acquired by the Samuel H. Kress Foundation in 1936. It was donated to the National Gallery of Art of Washington, DC in 1939 and where it is held as part of the gallery's Samuel H. Kress Collection.

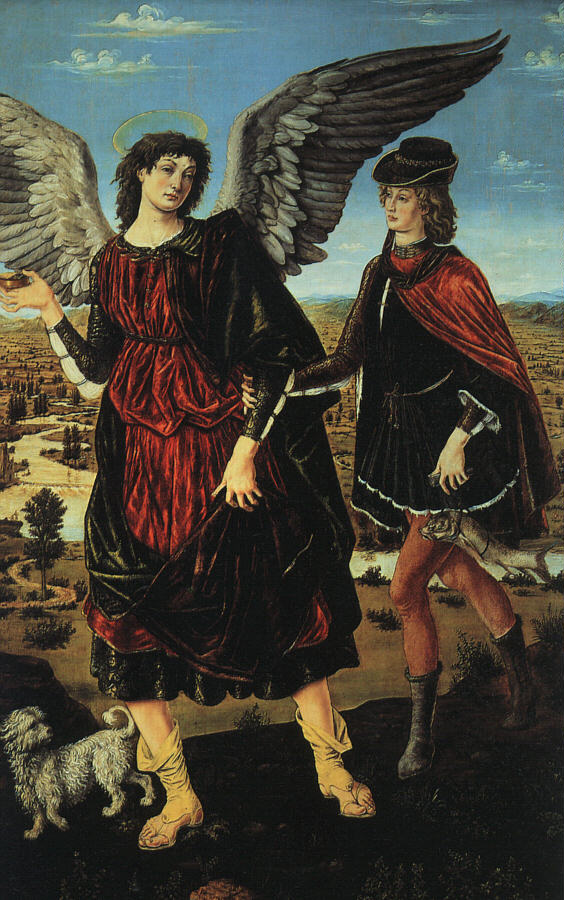
Tobias and the Angel, Antonio del Pollaiuolo, c. 1465–1470

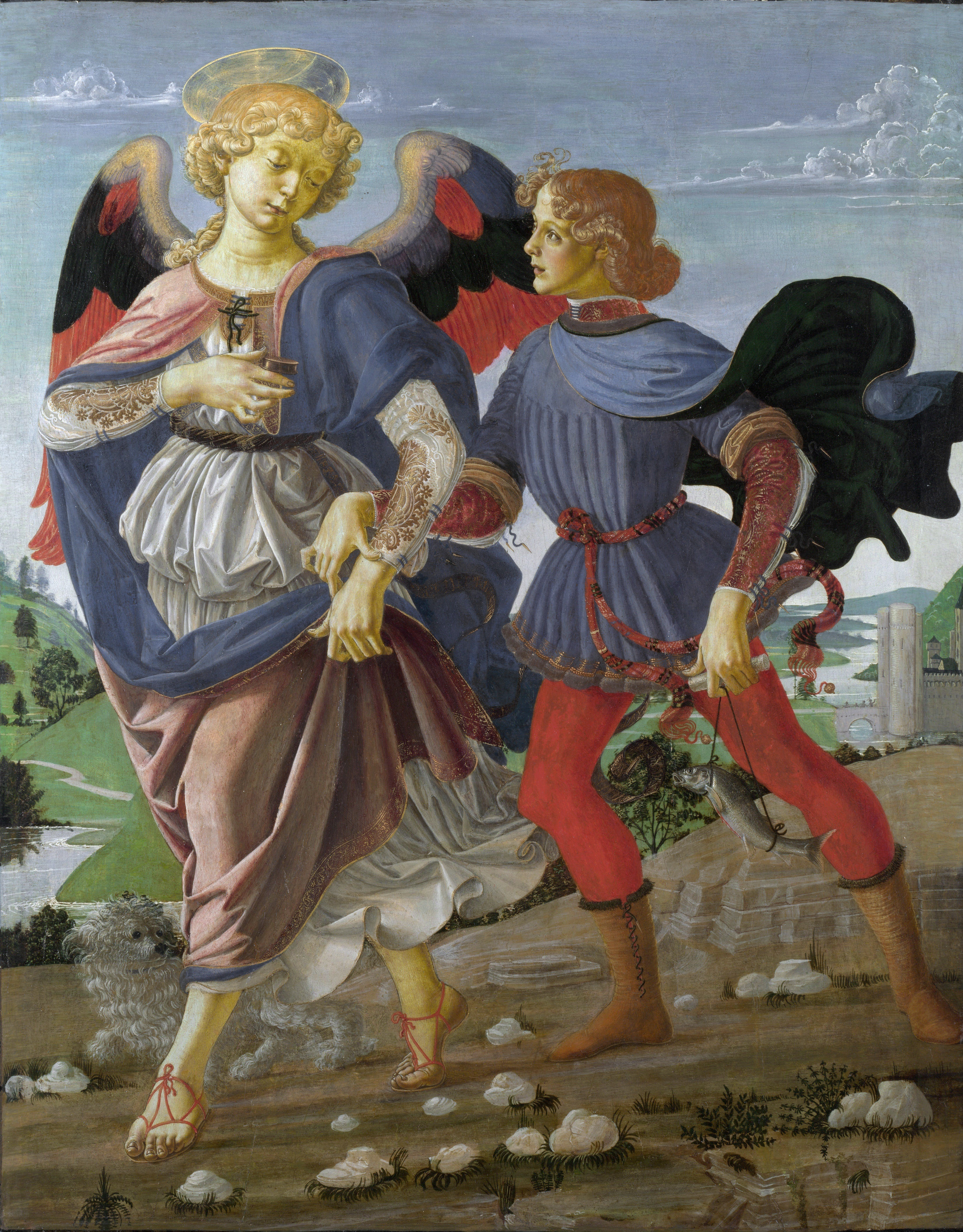
Tobias and the Angel, Andrea del Verrocchio, c. 1470–1475

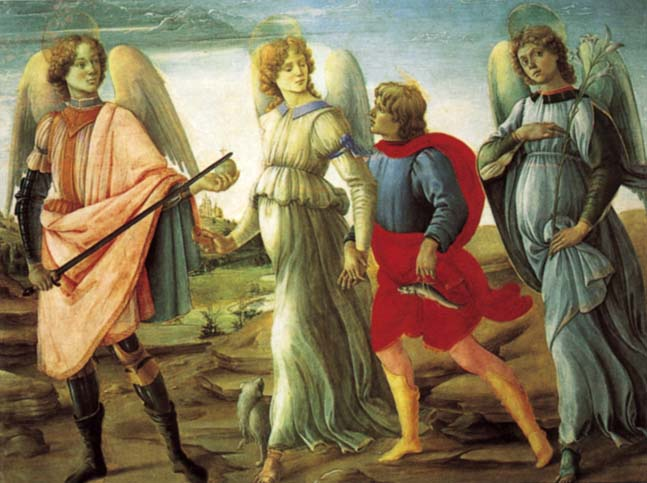
Three Angels and Young Tobias, Filippino Lippi, c. 1485
