= Allaert van Everdingen =

Dutch painter (1621–1675)

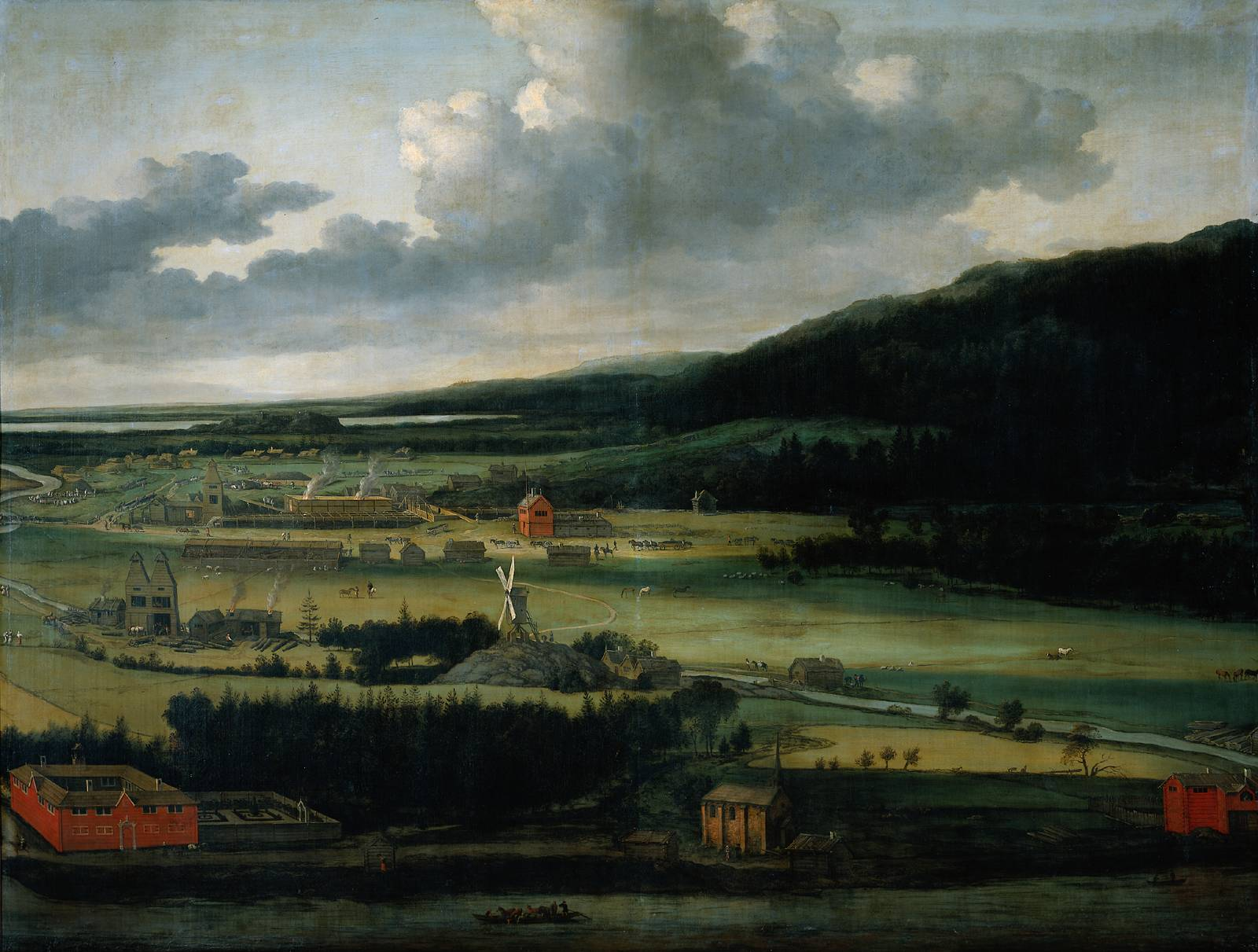
Cannon Foundry of Julitabroeck, Södermanland, Oil on canvas, 192 x 254.5 cm (Rijksmuseum, Amsterdam)

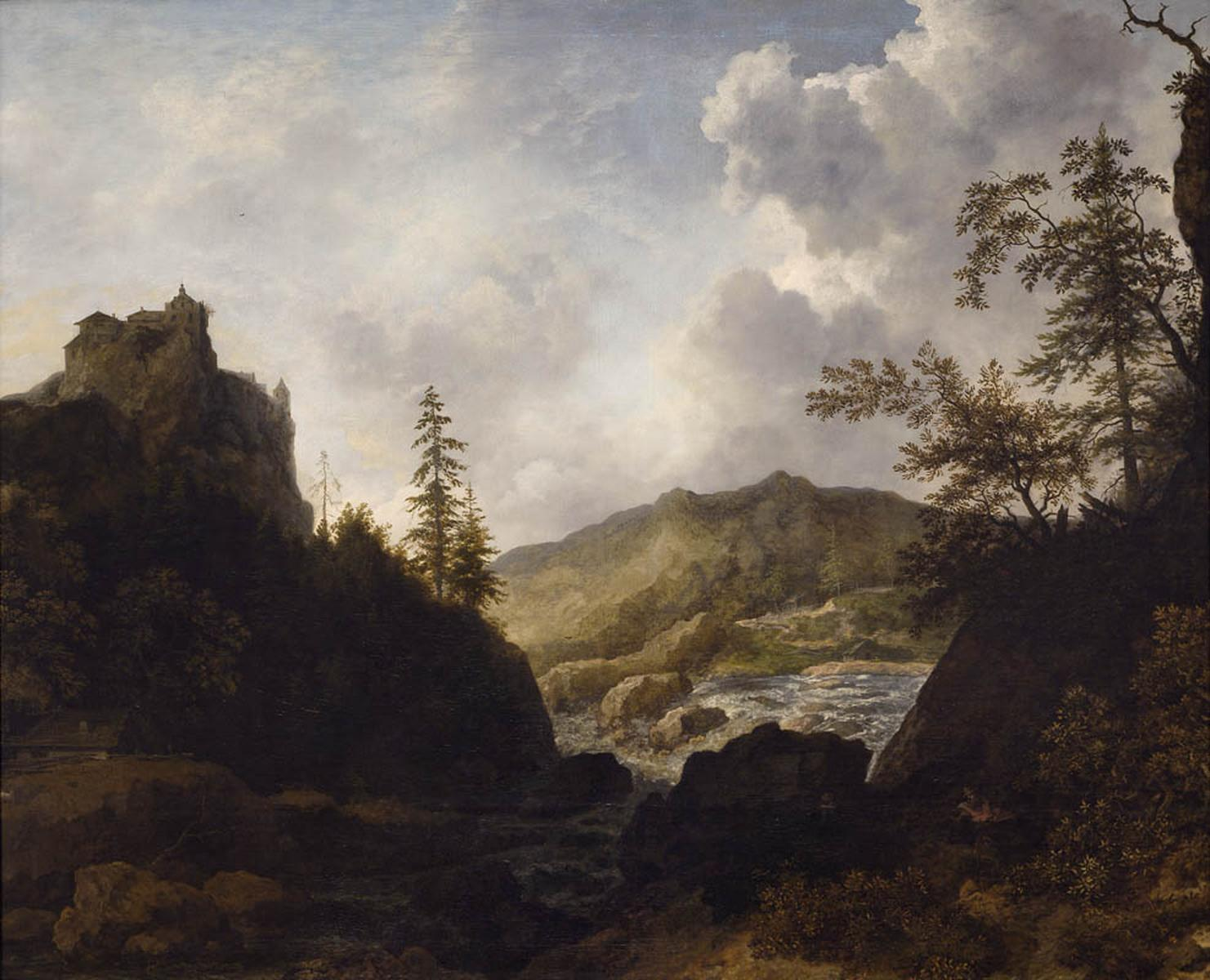
Nordic Landscape with a Castle on a Hill (c. 1660) Oil on canvas, 134 x 160 cm (Musée des Beaux-Arts, Strasbourg)

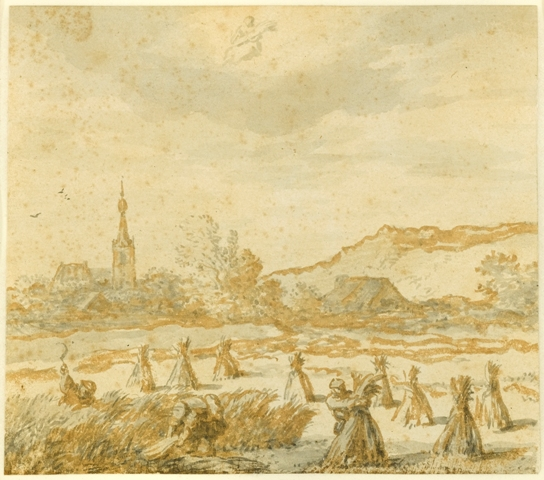
Month of August (Virgo): The Harvest, brush and grey and brown wash.

Allaert van Everdingen (Dutch pronunciation: [ˈɑlaːrt fɑn ˈeːvərdɪŋə(n)]; (Note: Van in isolation: [vɑn].) bapt. 18 June 1621 – 8 November 1675 (buried)), was a Dutch Golden Age painter and printmaker in etching and mezzotint.

== Biography ==
Van Everdingen was born at Alkmaar, the son of a government clerk. He and his older brothers, the painters Jan and Caesar van Everdingen, according to Arnold Houbraken, were taught by Roelandt Savery at Utrecht. Allaert moved in 1645 to Haarlem, where he studied under Pieter de Molijn. In February of that year he married Janneke Cornelisdr. Their first child, Cornelis, was born a year later. Allart finally settled about 1657 in Amsterdam, where he died in 1675.

=== Style ===
It would be difficult to find a greater contrast than that presented by the works of Savery and Everdingen. Savery inherited the brilliant style of the Brueghels, which he carried into the 17th century; whilst Everdingen realized the large and effective system of coloured and powerfully shaded landscape which characterises the precursors of Rembrandt. A fascination with the exotic is probably what inspired Allaert to travel himself, though it is quite within the range of probability that he acquired his approach from his drawing master, Pieter de Molijn.

=== Norwegian waterfalls ===
In 1644 Everdingen travelled to Norway and Sweden, a trip that was to have profound consequences on his art. According to his biographer Arnold Houbraken, his visit to Norway was unscheduled, but occurred when his ship, en route to the Baltic Sea, ran into a heavy storm and moored there for shelter. In the manner of Frans Post, Everdingen took advantage of this mishap by making sketches of the Norwegian landscape, which would have seemed very exotic to his Dutch countrymen. His annotated drawings document visits to the south-east Norwegian coast and to Bohusland and the Göteborg area in western Sweden. These sketches, which he later painted in his studio, became very popular, and though now scarce, exhibit a broad and sweeping mode of execution, differing but slightly from that transmitted at the dawn of the 17th century from Jan van Goyen to Salomon van Ruysdael. He returned to the Netherlands by 21 February 1645, when he married Janneke Cornelisdr Brouwers in Haarlem. He died in Amsterdam.

=== Haarlem school of landscape artists ===
Molijn wielded his own influence on his gifted disciple, but the school of landscape painters in Haarlem brought forth many young, talented artists who incorporated the tonal qualities of van Goyen. This can be seen in the development of Isaac van Ostade, who abandoned the genre techniques of his brother Adriaen van Ostade for the broader landscapes of the Ruisdael family. In Utrecht Allert would have also met Savery's nephew and namesake, the landscape artist and engraver Roelant Roghman, who probably returned with him on his trips to Alkmaar, where he made many prints. Alkmaar, itself a busy trading place near Texel island, had little of the picturesque for an artist except polders and dunes or waves and sky. Accordingly, we find Allaert at first a painter of coast scenery. But on one of his expeditions he is said to have been cast ashore in Norway, and during the repairs of his ship he visited the inland valleys, and thus gave a new course to his art.

== Works ==
In early pieces he cleverly represents the sea in motion under varied, but mostly clouded, aspects of sky. Their general intonation is strong and brown, and effects are rendered in a powerful key, but the execution is much more uniform than that of Jacob van Ruisdael. A dark scud lowering on a rolling sea near the walls of Flushing characterizes Everdingens Mouth of the Schelde in the Hermitage at St Petersburg. Storm is the marked feature of sea-pieces in the Staedel or Robartes collections; and a strand with wreckers at the foot of a cliff in the Munich Pinakothek may be a reminiscence of personal adventure in Norway. But the Norwegian coast was studied in calms as well as in gales; and a fine canvas at Munich shows fishermen on a still and sunny day taking herrings to a smoking hut at the foot of a Norwegian crag.

The earliest of Everdingen's sea-pieces bears the date of 1640. After 1640 we meet with nothing but representations of inland scenery, and particularly of Norwegian valleys. The masters favorite theme is a fall in a glen, with fringes of pines interspersed with birch, and log-huts at the base of rocks and craggy slopes. The water tumbles over the foreground, so as to entitle the painter to the name of inventor of cascades.

Five of Everdingen's cascades are in the museum of Copenhagen alone: of these, one is dated 1647, another 1649. In the Hermitage at St Petersburg is a fine example of 1647; another in the Pinakothek at Munich was finished in 1656. One of his best-known masterpieces is the Norwegian glen belonging to Lord Listowel. Of his etchings and drawings there are much larger and more numerous specimens in England than elsewhere. Being a collector as well as an engraver and painter, he brought together a large number of works of all kinds and masters; and the sale of these by his heirs at Amsterdam on 11 March 1676 gives an approximate clue to the date of the painters death.

His two brothers, Jan and Caesar, were both good painters according to Houbraken, though Jan had a civil job that kept him from his hobby.

== Exhibitions ==
Allart van Everdingen (1621–1675), Het ruige landschap. Stedelijk Museum Alkmaar, 9 September 2021 through 16 January 2022. Exhibition catalogue edited by Christi M. Klinkert and Yvonne Bleyerveld. Translation by Lynn Richards. Allart van Everdingen, 1621–1675: Master of the Rugged Landscape. Rotterdam: nai010, 2021.
