= Nordic Landscape with a Castle on a Hill =

Painting by Allaert van Everdingen

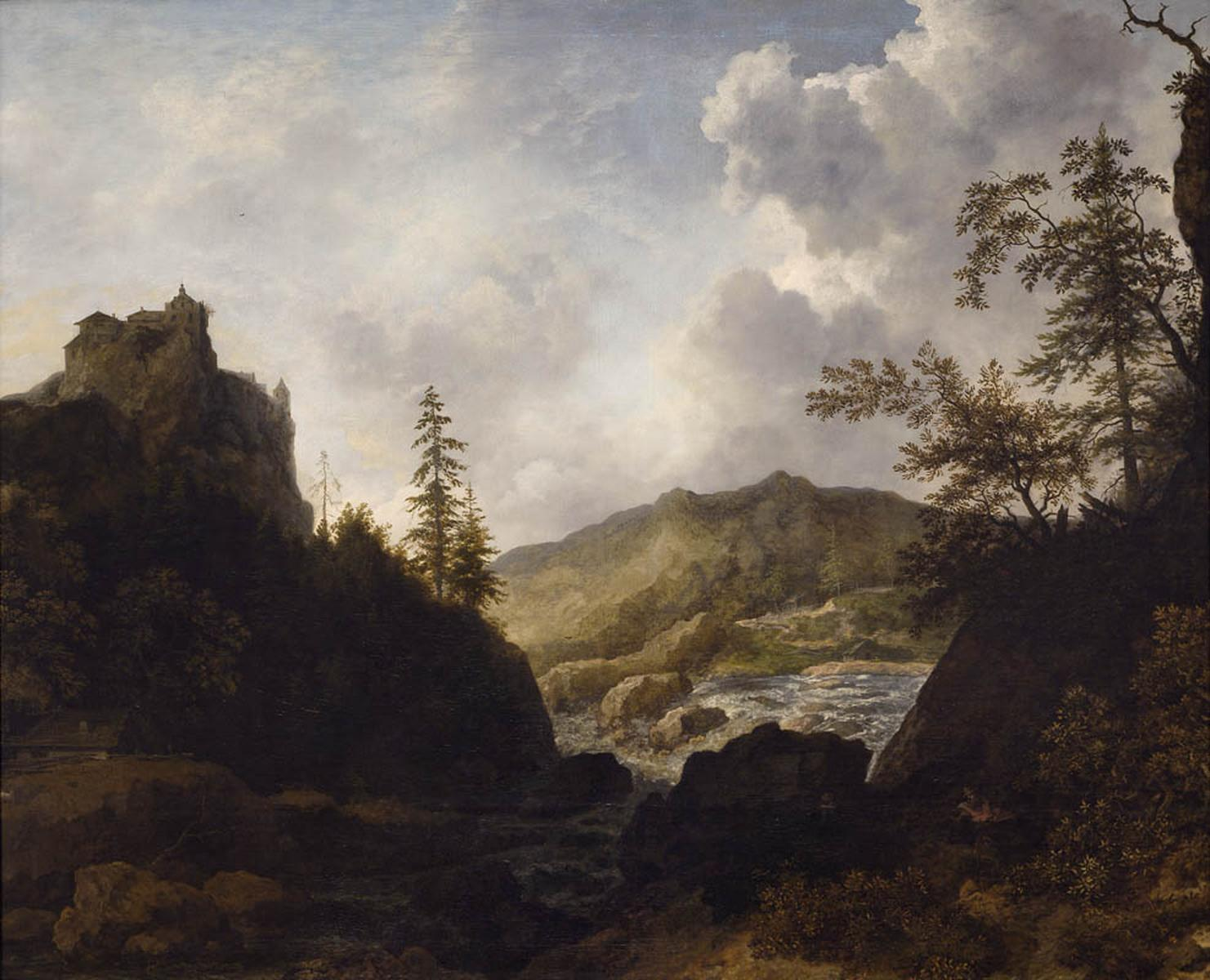
- Artist: Allaert van Everdingen
- Year: circa 1660
- Medium: oil painting on canvas
- Movement: Landscape painting Dutch Golden Age painting
- Dimensions: 134 cm × 160 cm (53 in × 63 in)
- Location: Musée des Beaux-Arts, Strasbourg
- Accession: 1908

Nordic Landscape with a Castle on a Hill is a circa 1660 oil painting by the Dutch Golden Age painter Allaert van Everdingen. It is on display in the Musée des Beaux-Arts of Strasbourg, France. Its inventory number is 560.

This imposing Dutch landscape painting – the largest of its kind in the Strasbourg collection, although among 17th-century landscape paintings there, the Italian Rosa's Landscape with Tobias and the Angel is even larger – was bought in Paris in 1905 by Karl Trübner, on behalf on the museum, and entered the collection in 1908. Its previous history is not known.

Van Everdingen had travelled to Norway and Sweden in 1644, and several of his subsequent landscape paintings, such as the Strasbourg one, are inspired by motives such as hills and mountains, torrents and lakes, forests and skies, as he had seen them there. Only the castle on the hill is not Scandinavian. The Strasbourg painting does not depict a specific place but aggregates different naturalistic elements into a coherent and intimidating whole. This kind of landscape painting was much admired and emulated by the German Nordic school of the early 19th century, most notably by Caspar David Friedrich and Johan Christian Dahl. Nordic Landscape with a Castle on a Hill incidentally includes the depiction of two busy draughtsmen at the lower right, as a probable reminiscence of Van Everdingen's own Northern journey.
