= Tobias and the Angel (disambiguation) =

Tobias and the Angel is a subject in art taken from the Book of Tobit. It may refer to a number of works of art and music, including:

- Tobias and the Angel (Pollaiuolo), a c. 1465–1470 painting by Antonio and Piero del Pollaiuolo
- Tobias and the Angel (Verrocchio), a 1470–1475 painting attributed to the workshop of Andrea del Verrocchio
- Tobias and the Angel (Filippino Lippi), a c. 1475–1480 painting by Filippino Lippi
- Certosa di Pavia Altarpiece, a c. 1496–1500 altarpiece by Pietro Perugino
- The Archangel Raphael and Tobias (Titian), a c. 1512−1514 painting by Titian; also a c. 1540−1545 painting by him
- Tobias and the Angel (sculpture), a 1516 sculptural group by Veit Stoss
- Landscape with Tobias and the Angel (Rosa), a c. 1670 painting by Salvator Rosa
- Tobias and the Angel (opera), a 1999 community opera by Jonathan Dove, with a libretto by David Lan
