= Schlachtkapelle =

Coordinates: 47°08′46″N 8°12′44″E

Schlachtkapelle (lit. "battle chapel") is a term used in Switzerland for a chapel dedicated to the memory of one of the battles of the Old Swiss Confederacy.

Schlachtkapellen in Switzerland include those commemorating:

- the battle of Morgarten (1315),
- the battle of Sempach (1386),
- the battle of Näfels (1388),
- the battle of Stoss (1405),
- the battle of Dornach (1499),

among others.

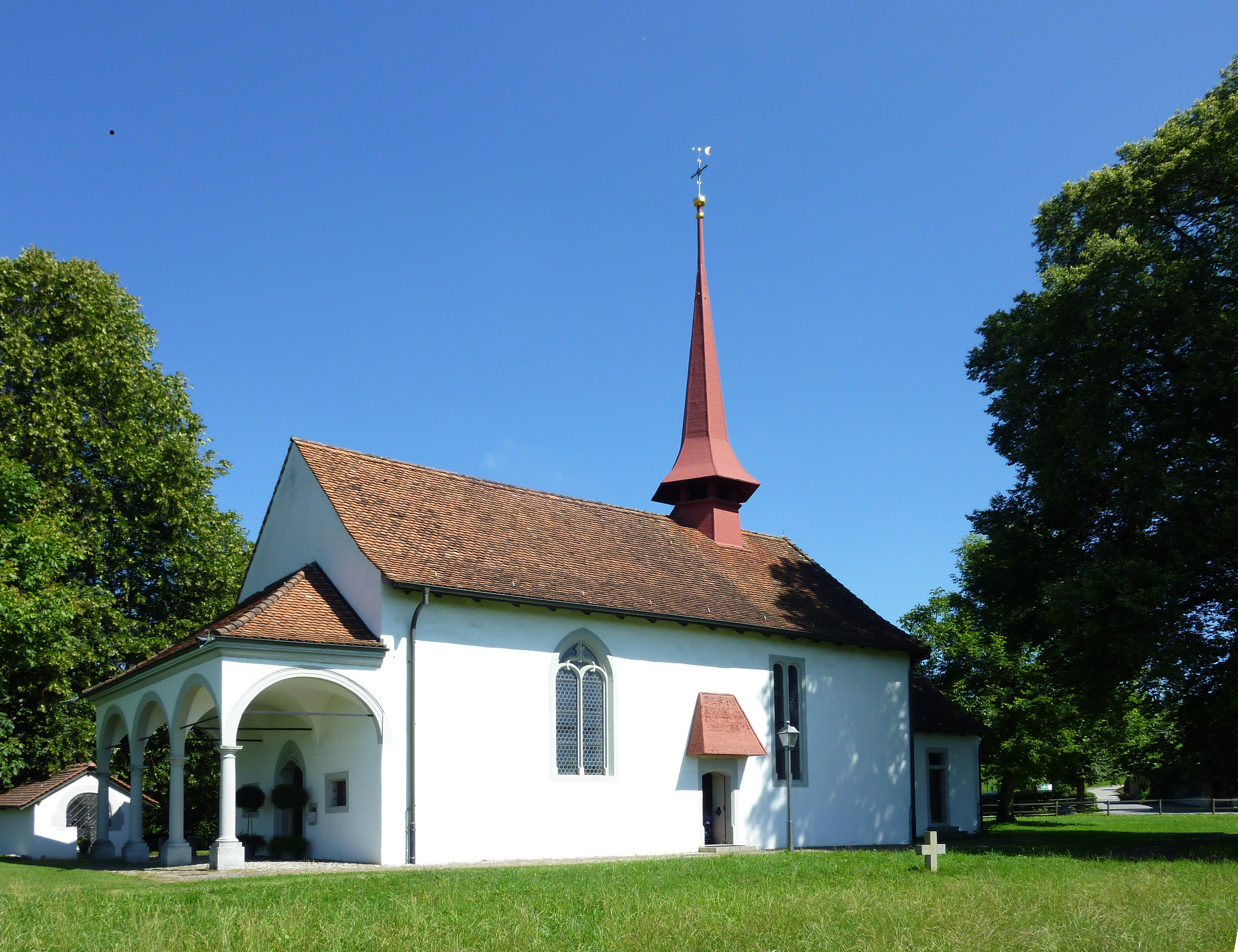
Schlachtkapelle Sempach

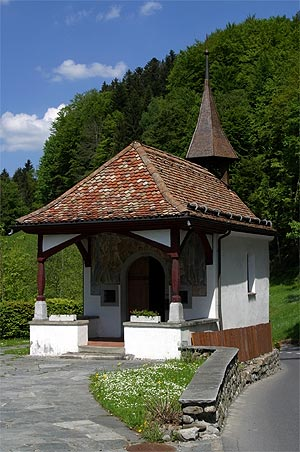
Schlachtkapelle Morgarten

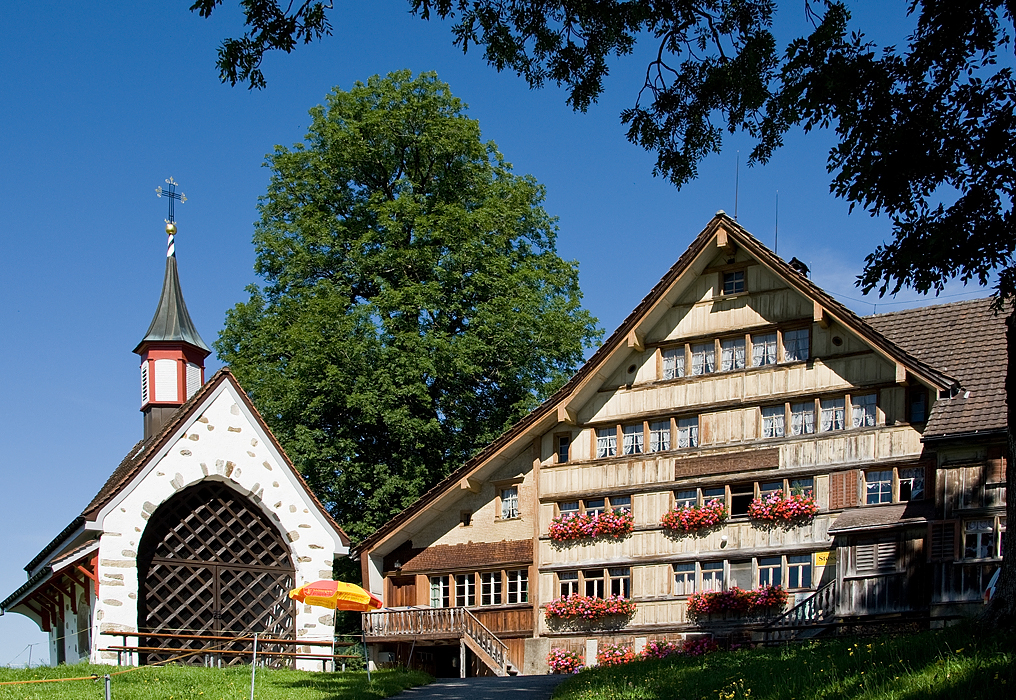
Schlachtkapelle Stoss

== Literature ==
- Martin Steger und Josef Fink: Die Schlachtkapelle von Sempach, (Broschüre), 1999
- Jürg Davatz Die erste Kapelle von Näfels - eine Schlachtkapelle des Landes Glarus von 1389. In: Jahrbuch des Historischen Vereins des Kantons Glarus, 72, S. 53-82. 1988. OCLC 2087997
- Joseph Widmer: Geist der alten Schweizer in Beziehung auf die gegenwärtige Zeit; Eine Rede, gehalten an der jährlichen Gedächtnissfeyer bey der Schlacht Kapelle ob Sempach 1815. Luzern. Xaver Meyer, Luzern 1815.
