= Landscape with Tobias and the Angel (Rosa) =

Painting by Salvator Rosa

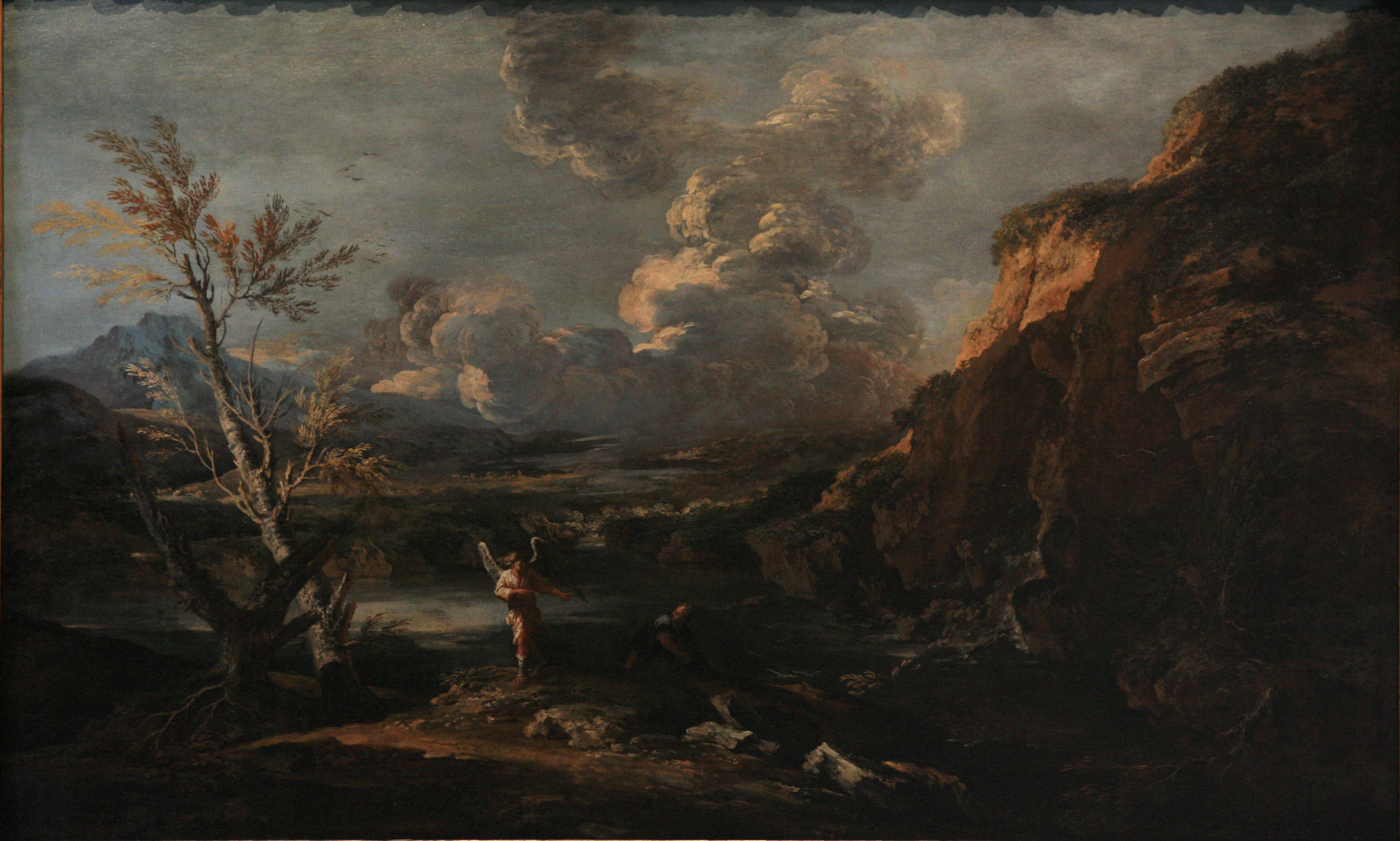
- Artist: Salvator Rosa
- Year: c. 1670
- Medium: oil painting on canvas
- Movement: Baroque painting Landscape painting History painting
- Subject: Tobias and the Angel
- Dimensions: 121 cm × 195 cm (48 in × 77 in)
- Location: Musée des Beaux-Arts, Strasbourg
- Accession: 1890

Landscape with Tobias and the Angel is a large Baroque landscape painting created c. 1670 by the Southern Italian painter Salvator Rosa. Although principally a landscape painting, it elevates its status to a history painting by including the small figures of Tobias and the Angel, a Christian subject from the Book of Tobit, with the fish from the river Tigris. The painting is now in the Musée des Beaux-Arts of Strasbourg, France. Its inventory number is 182.

== Background ==
Landscape with Tobias and the Angel was painted in Rome, after the artist's 1662 journey to Venice. It was the first of a series of increasingly small and austere depictions of the subject. The large Strasbourg painting (of which three replicas exist, one of which is now in the National Gallery, and another in the Wadsworth Atheneum) has been much praised for its expressiveness and its virtuosity since the 18th century. It was bought by Wilhelm von Bode in London in 1890; its previous history can be traced back to 1777, when it was bought at a Parisian auction by Louis-Antoine de Rohan-Chabot of the House of Rohan-Chabot.

The depicted landscape is imaginary but probably inspired by the Phlegraean Fields of Rosa's Neapolitan home province, although some art historians have interpreted it as the Tiber Valley near Monte Soratte.
