= Ruisdael =

Ruisdael or Ruysdael is a Dutch surname. Notable persons with that name include:

- Jacob Isaackszoon van Ruisdael (c. 1629–1682), Dutch Golden Age landscape painter, best-known of his family
- Salomon van Ruysdael (c. 1602–1670), Dutch Golden Age landscape painter, uncle of Jacob and second-best known of the family
- Jacob Salomonszoon van Ruysdael (1629–1681), Dutch Golden Age landscape painter, cousin of Jacob and often confused with him
- Isaack van Ruisdael (1599–1677), Dutch Golden Age landscape painter, father of Jacob (few works known)
