= February 7 (Eastern Orthodox liturgics) =

Day in the Eastern Orthodox liturgical calendar

Eastern Orthodox liturgical calendar
February 6	February 7	February 8
February 7 O.S. ≍ February 20 N.S. February 7 N.S ≍ January 25 O.S.

An Eastern Orthodox cross

February 7 in Eastern Orthodox liturgical calendars is a feast day and a day of commemoration of saints and martyrs. Although some Orthodox churches use the Revised Julian Calendar and others use the traditional Julian calendar, the fixed commemorations for their respective February 7 are broadly the same, no matter which calendar is used. (Note: Despite the dates being the same, the days to which they refer typically differ by 13 days. The notation Old Style or O.S. is sometimes used to indicate a date in the traditional Julian Calendar (the "Old Calendar"). The notation New Style or N.S, indicates a date in the Revised Julian calendar (the "New Calendar").)

== Feasts ==
- Afterfeast of the Meeting of our Lord in the Temple.

== Saints ==
- Martyr Agathangelus, in Damascus (3rd century)
- The 1,003 Martyrs of Nicomedia (303)
- Martyr Theopemptus and the Six Martyrs of Phrygia, by fire (c. 305)
- Martyr Audatus (Adaucus), in Phrygia (4th century) (Note: "In Phrygia, St. Adaucus, martyr, an Italian of noble birth, who was honored by the emperors with almost every dignity. Whilst he was still discharging the office of quaestor, he was judged worthy of the crown of martyrdom for his defence of the faith.")
- Saint Parthenius, Bishop of Lampsacus on the Hellespont (4th century) (Note: Name days celebrated today include: Parthenios (Παρθένιος); Parthenia, Parthena (Παρθενία, Παρθένα).)
- Saint Mastridia of Jerusalem, woman ascetic of the desert (c. 580)
- Venerable Luke the Younger (Luke of Mt. Steiris, Luke Thaumaturgus, Luke of Hellas), founder of the Monastery of Hosios Loukas (953) (Note: Kontakion. Fourth Tone. "God, Who by judgments known to Him chose thee ere thou wast formed that thou, O Luke, mightest be right well-pleasing unto Him, from the womb made thee His own and He sanctified thee; as His own true faithful servant hath He shown thee forth and hath set aright thy footsteps, ever guiding thee as the Friend of man; thou rejoicest before Him now.") (see also: May 3 - Translation)
- Saint Aprionus of Cyprus, Bishop. (Note: He is recorded in the Synaxarion of Constantinople.)
- Venerable Peter of Monovatia, ascetic.
- Venerable Sarapion of Cyprus. (Note: He is not mentioned in the Synaxaria. His memory is recorded in the 'Patmiako' Codex 266.)

== Pre-Schism Western saints ==
- Hieromartyr Augulus (Avgul, Augurius, Aule), Bishop of Augusta, Britain (c. 303) (Note: An early martyr and bishop, probably in France, though some have suggested London in England.) (Note: "At London, in England, the birthday of the blessed bishop Augulus, who terminated his career by martyrdom, and deserved to receive an eternal recompense.") (Note: "AUGULUS is named on this day in the Roman Martyrology, and in all the ancient calendars, as a bishop, who suffered martyrdom in London. No Acts of his are known to exist; but the conjecture of historians is, that he suffered in the persecution of Diocletian, about the same time as St. Alban.")
- Saint Chrysolius, an Armenian who enlightened the north-east of France, where he became bishop and was martyred (4th century) (Note: Having left Armenia during the persecution of Diocletian, he won martyrdom in Flanders. His relics were venerated in Bruges in Belgium.)
- Saint Juliana of Bologna (435) (Note: A matron in Bologna in Italy whose piety and charity were praised by St Ambrose of Milan. Her husband left her to become a priest with her consent and she devoted herself to bringing up her four children and to the service of the Church and the poor.)
- Saint Anatolius, Bishop of Cahors in France (5th century?)
- Saint Laurence of Siponto, called Majoranus, Bishop of Siponto in Italy, who built the church of St Michael on Mt. Gargano (c. 546) (Note: Bishop Laurence of Siponto witnessed an apparition of the Archangel Michael on Mount Gargano near Manfredonia in southern Italy about the year 490 AD, in memory of which the famous Monastery of the Archangel was founded. The Sanctuary of Monte Sant'Angelo is the oldest shrine in Western Europe dedicated to the archangel Michael and has been an important pilgrimage site since the middle ages. The historic site and its environs are protected by the Parco Nazionale del Gargano. In 2011, it became a UNESCO World Heritage Site as part of a group of seven, inscribed as Longobards in Italy. Places of the power (568-774 A.D.).) (Note: "The Liber de apparitione Sancti Michaelis in Monte Gargano (BHL 5948),...recounts the foundation of the shrine and church at the Monte S. Angelo on the Gargano peninsula... ...A date of composition for the Liber de apparitione between c. 663 and 750 is more than feasible, and the period soon after the annexation of Siponto in the 660s most likely.")
- Saint Tressan (Trésain), a missionary from Ireland, he was ordained priest by St Remigius, and preached in Mareuil on the Marne in France (550)
- Saint Fidelis, Bishop of Mérida (c. 570) (Note: Eastern by origin, he travelled to Spain with some merchants and settled in Mérida, where he became a disciple of St Paul, bishop of the city, whom he later succeeded.)
- Saint Meldon (Medon), from Ireland, he became a hermit in France and reposed at Péronne (6th century) (Note: "Of this Irish saint and bishop, who left his native land and died at Peronne, nothing is known. His acts have been lost. Yet, at one time he must have been famous, for many churches are dedicated to him. He is sometimes called Medan. In the revelations of S. Fursey, reference is made to S. Meldan.")
- Saint Ronan (Ronane, Roman), Bishop of Kilmaronen (7th century)
- Saint Richard the Pilgrim (Richard of Wessex), King and Confessor, father of Saints Willibald, Wunnibald and Walburga (720) (Note: A noble from the west of England and father of Sts Willibald, Winebald and Walburga. He reposed at Lucca on a pilgrimage to Rome.)
- Saint Amulwinus, Bishop of Lobbes in Belgium and the successor of St Erminus (c. 750)
- Saint Romuald, Abbot (1027)

== Post-Schism Orthodox saints ==
- Saint Euthymius, monk of Glinsk Hermitage (1866)
- New Martyr George of Alikianos on Crete, by beheading (1867)
- Venerable Boniface, Abbot, of Theofania, Kiev (1871)

=== New martyrs and confessors ===
- New Monk-Martyr Vladimir (Elizarov) (1930)
- New Hieromartyr Alexander Talizin, Priest (1938)
- New Hieromartyr Barlaam (Ryashentsev), Archbishop of Perm (1942) (Note: See: (in Russian) Варлаам (Ряшенцев). Википедии. (Russian Wikipedia).)
- New Hieromartyr Alexis, Priest (1942)

== Other commemorations ==
- Repose of Archimandrite Gennadius, ascetic of the Roslavl Forests (1826), and commemoration of his disciple, Abramius, desert-dweller of Whitehoof Convent (1868), and the latter’s spiritual daughter Abbess Alexandra (1883)
- Repose of Archimandrite Cyril (Pavlov) of St. Sergius Lavra, confessor to patriarchs Alexy II, Alexy I and Pimen (2017)

== Icon gallery ==
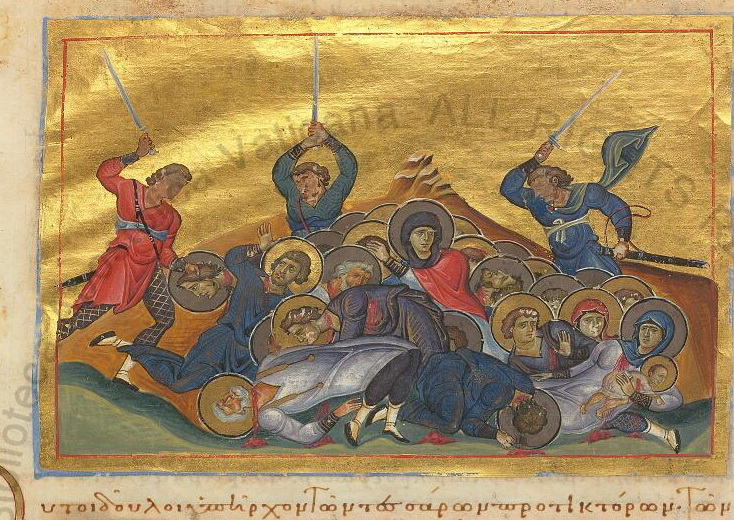
The 1,003 Martyrs of Nicomedia.
(Menologion of Basil II, 10th century).

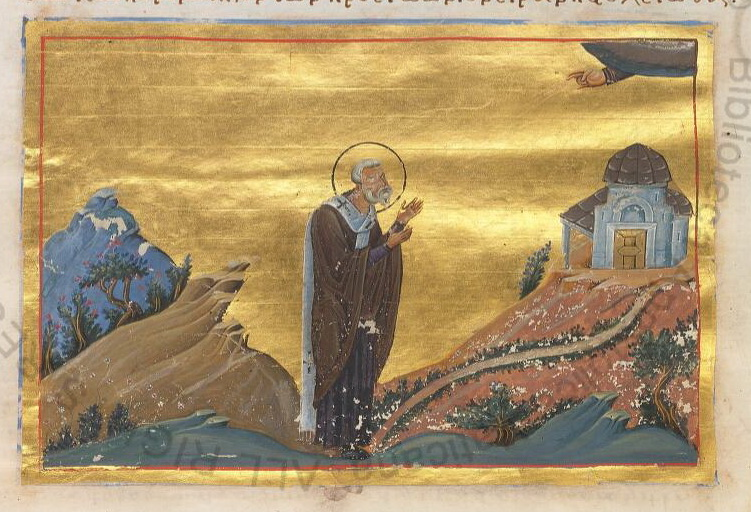
St. Parthenius, Bishop of Lampsacus on the Hellespont.
(Menologion of Basil II, 10th century).

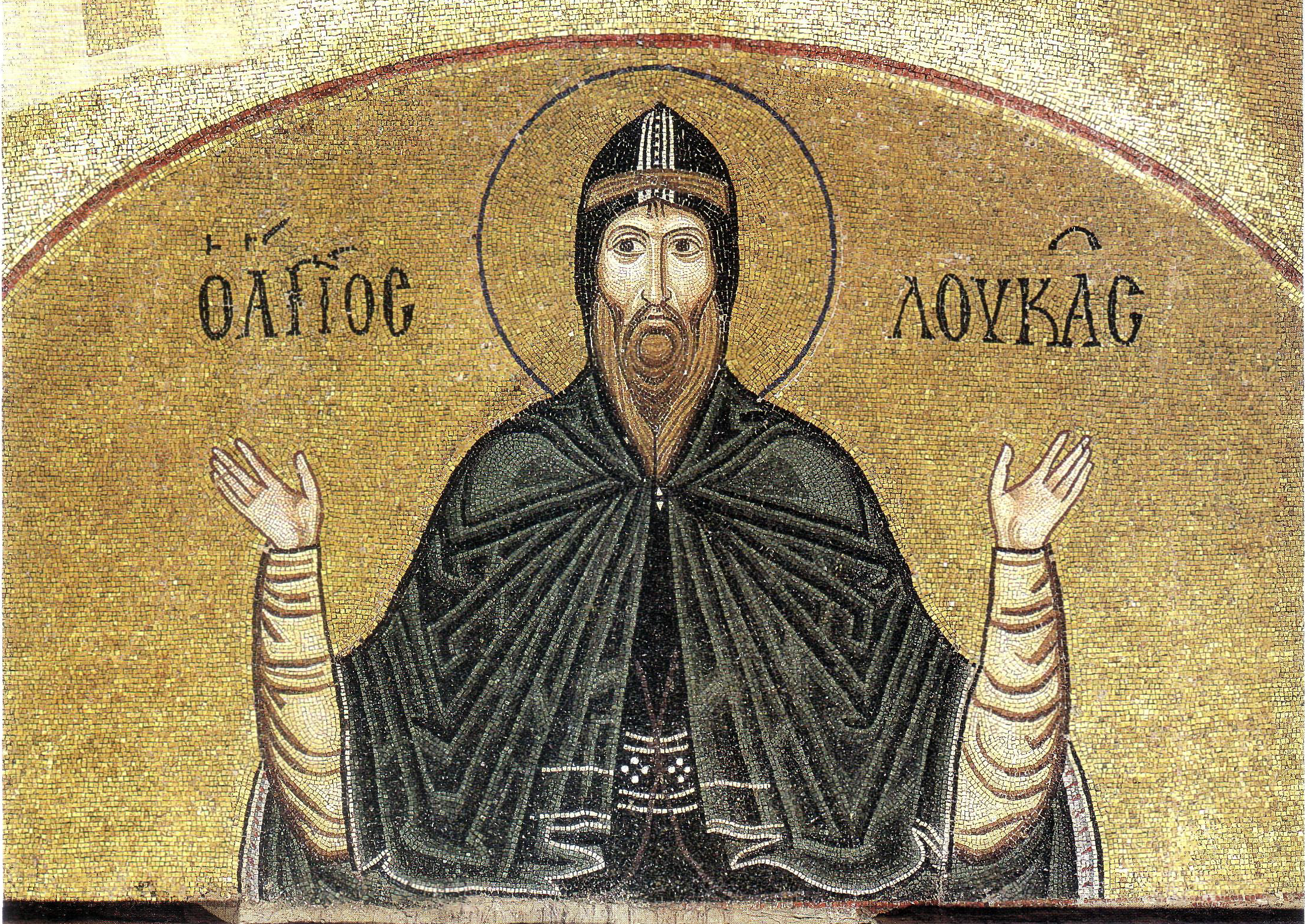
Venerable Luke the Younger
(Luke of Mt. Steiris, Luke Thaumaturgus, Luke of Hellas).

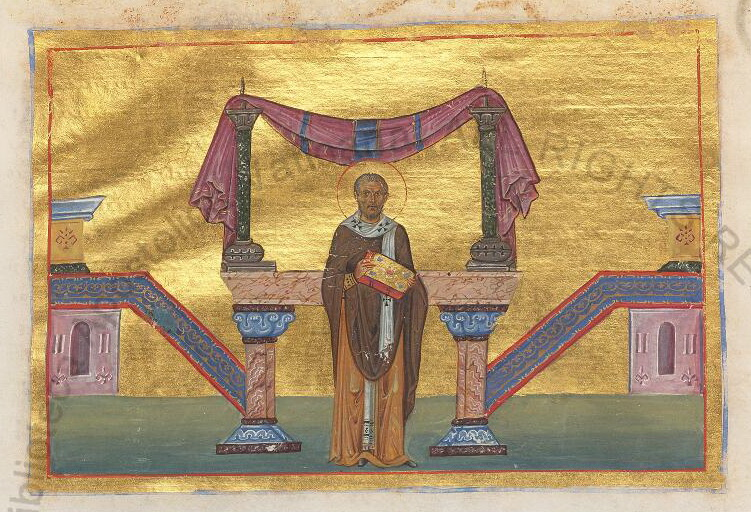
St. Aprionus of Cyprus, Bishop.
(Menologion of Basil II, 10th century).

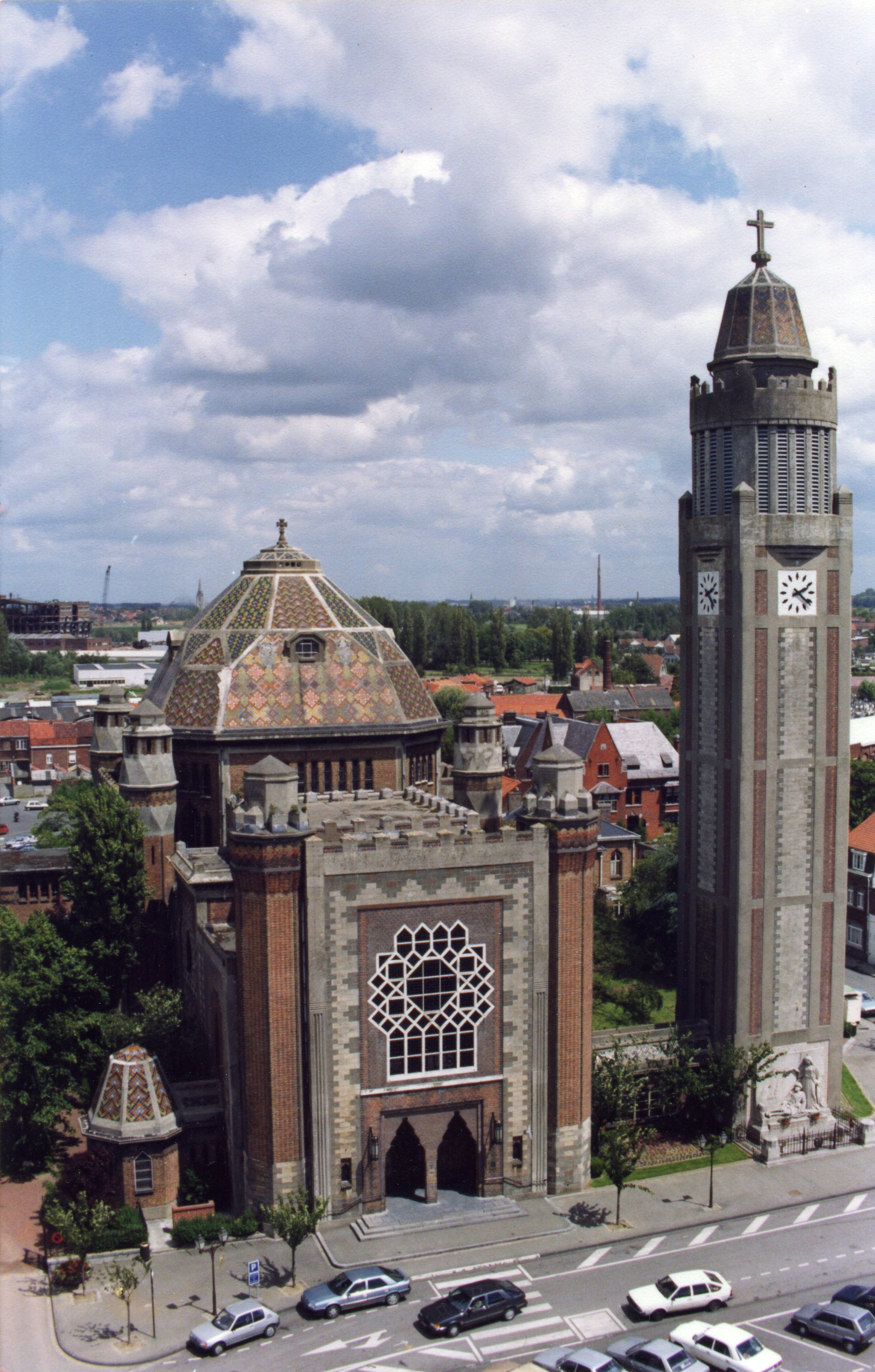
Church of St. Chrysolius, in Komen, Belgium.

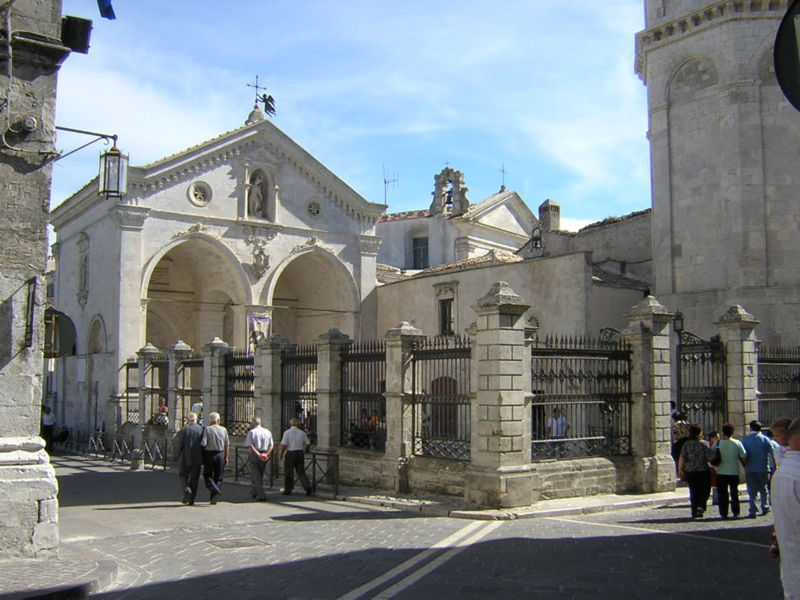
Sanctuary of Monte Sant'Angelo on Mt. Gargano.

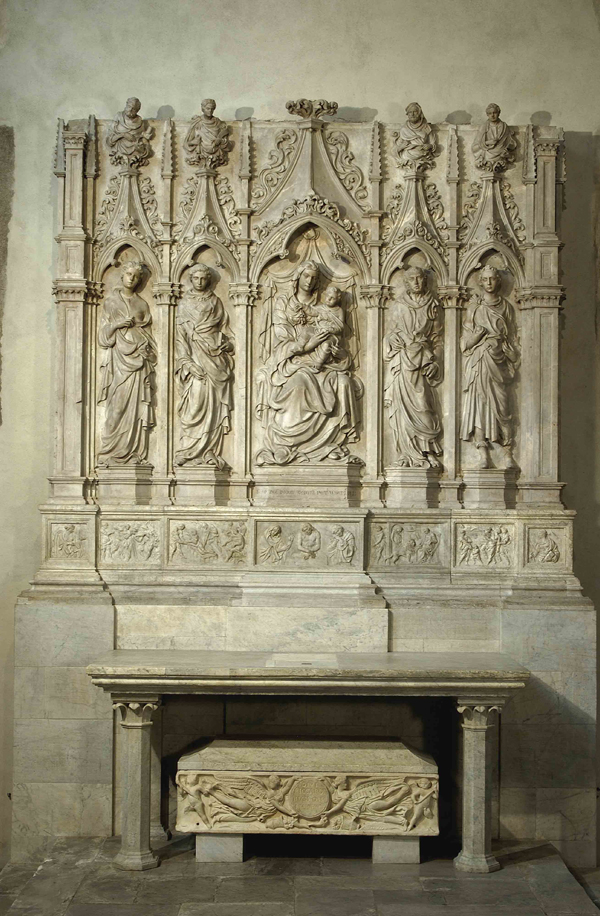
Altarpiece and shrine of Saint Richard the Pilgrim, in San Frediano, at Lucca.

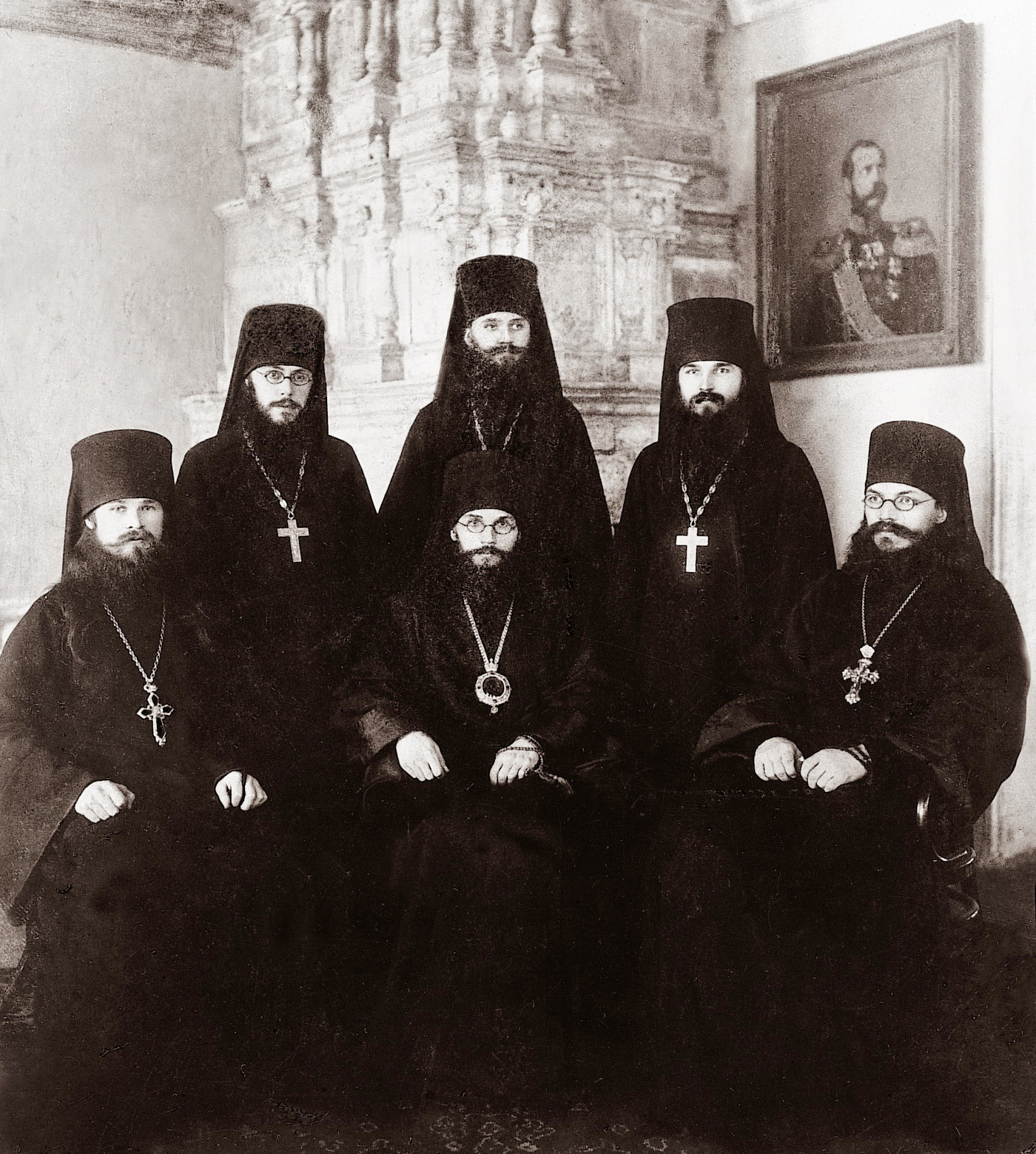
Archimandrite Barlaam (Ryashentsev), among the clergy of the Moscow Theological Academy (sitting, front left).

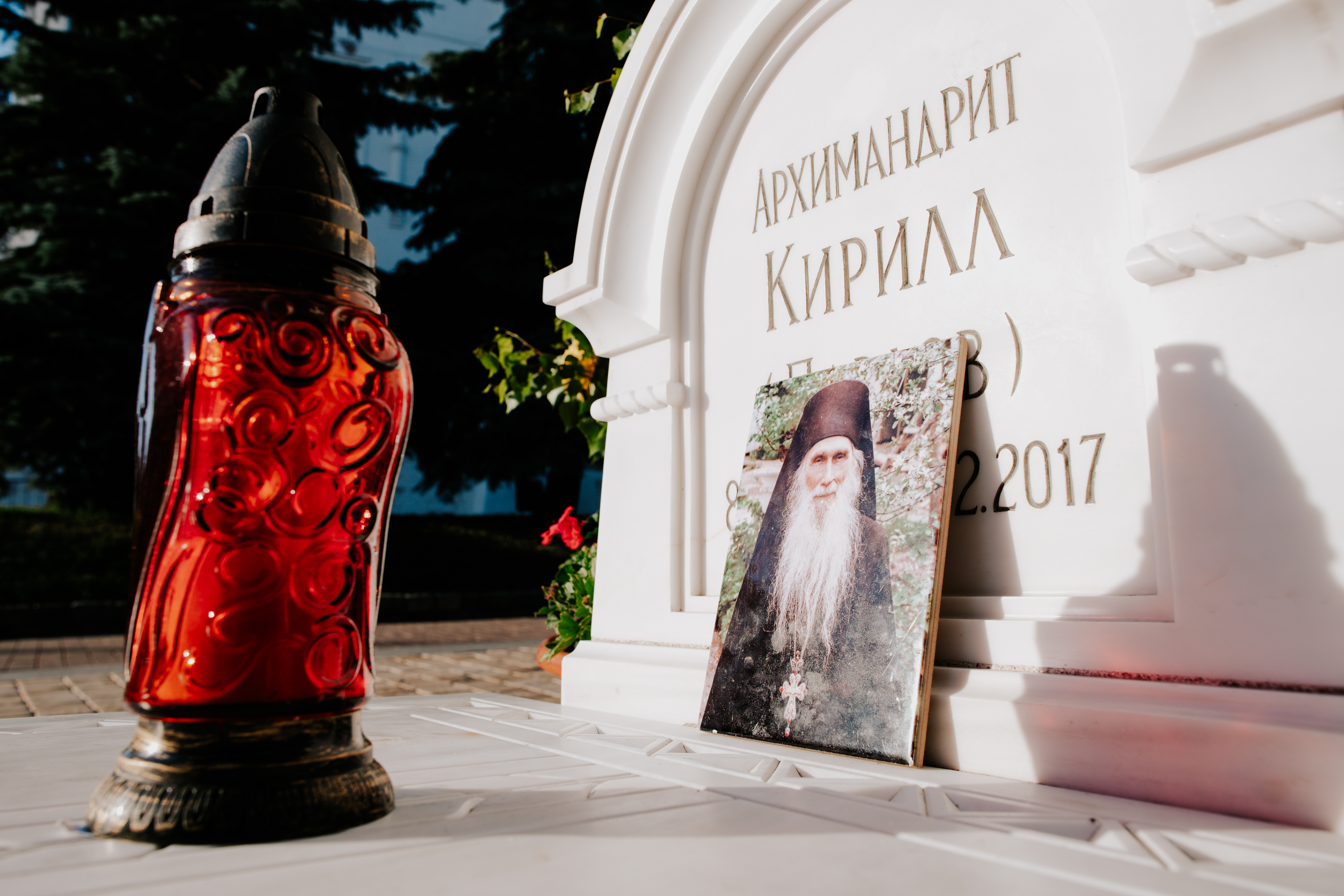
Grave of Archimandrite Kirill (Pavlov).

== Sources ==
- February 7 / 20. Orthodox Calendar (Pravoslavie.ru).
- February 20 / 7. Holy Trinity Russian Orthodox Church (A parish of the Patriarchate of Moscow).
- February 7. OCA - The Lives of the Saints.
- The Autonomous Orthodox Metropolia of Western Europe and the Americas. St. Hilarion Calendar of Saints for the year of our Lord 2004. St. Hilarion Press (Austin, TX). p. 13.
- The Seventh Day of the Month of February. Orthodoxy in China.
- February 7. Latin Saints of the Orthodox Patriarchate of Rome.
- The Roman Martyrology. Transl. by the Archbishop of Baltimore. Last Edition, According to the Copy Printed at Rome in 1914. Revised Edition, with the Imprimatur of His Eminence Cardinal Gibbons. Baltimore: John Murphy Company, 1916. pp. 40–41.
- Rev. Richard Stanton. A Menology of England and Wales, or, Brief Memorials of the Ancient British and English Saints Arranged According to the Calendar, Together with the Martyrs of the 16th and 17th Centuries. London: Burns & Oates, 1892. pp. 55–58.

Greek Sources

- Great Synaxaristes: (in Greek) 7 Φεβρουαρίου. Μεγασ Συναξαριστησ.
- (in Greek) Συναξαριστής. 7 Φεβρουαρίου. Ecclesia.gr. (H Εκκλησια Τησ Ελλαδοσ).

Russian Sources

- (in Russian) 20 февраля (7 февраля). Православная Энциклопедия под редакцией Патриарха Московского и всея Руси Кирилла (электронная версия). (Orthodox Encyclopedia - Pravenc.ru).
