= Sanctuary of Monte Sant'Angelo =

Roman Catholic sanctuary on Mount Gargano, Apulia, Italy

Coordinates: 41°42′27.8″N 15°57′17.2″E

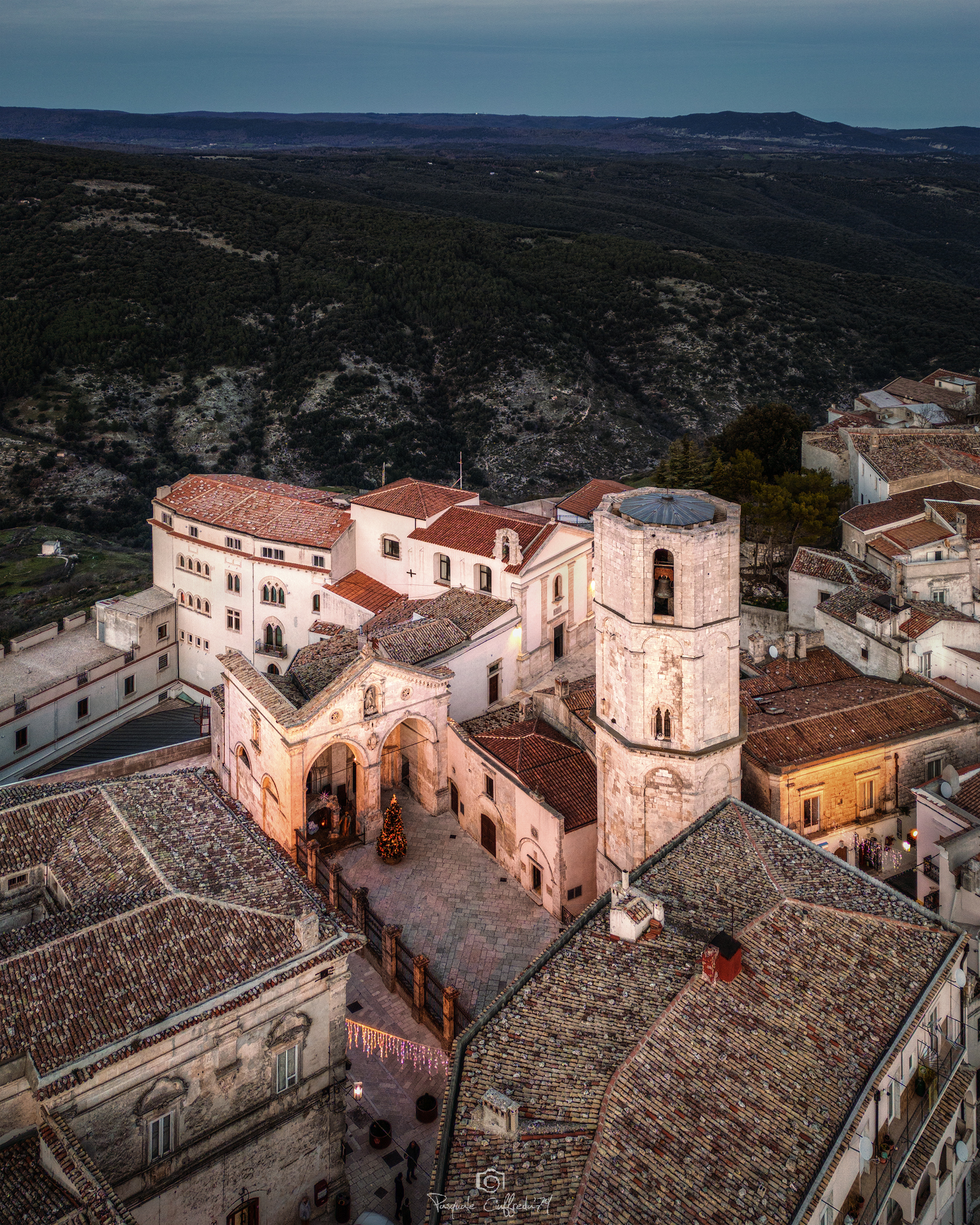
The Sanctuary of Saint Michael the Archangel on Mount Gargano, Italy

The Sanctuary of Saint Michael the Archangel (Italian: Santuario di San Michele Arcangelo) is a Roman Catholic shrine on Mount Gargano, Italy, part of the commune of Monte Sant'Angelo, in the province of Foggia, northern Apulia. It has the designation of a minor basilica.

It is the oldest shrine in Western Europe dedicated to the Archangel Michael and has been an important site of pilgrimage since the early Middle Ages. The historic site and its environs are protected by the Gargano National Park.

In 2011, it became a UNESCO World Heritage Site as part of a group of seven inscribed as Longobards in Italy: Places of Power (568-774 A.D.).

== Legendary history ==
The earliest account of the foundation of the Sanctuary is a composite Latin hagiographical text known as Liber de apparitione Sancti Michaelis in Monte Gargano (Bibliotheca Hagiographica Latina 5948).

There are three sections to the legend, recording three apparitions of Michael: the first and third sections appear to be part of the same narrative, while the second is possibly the account of a battle half a century later. According to the first and last parts of the legend, around the year 490 the Archangel Michael appeared several times to the Bishop of Sipontum near a cave in the mountains, instructing that the cave be dedicated to Christian worship and promising protection of the nearby town of Sipontum from pagan invaders. These apparitions are also the first appearances of Saint Michael in western Europe.

The second section of the text describes Michael's intercession on behalf of the Sipontans and the Beneventans against invading pagan Neapolitans. On the eve of the battle, Michael appeared with flaming sword atop the mountain; the Sipontans and Beneventans were victorious. Giorgio Otranto identifies this battle as the one recorded in Book 4 of Paul the Deacon's History of the Lombards, which describes the defense of Mount Gargano against unidentified 'Greeks' – possibly Byzantine Greeks – by the Lombard Duke of Benevento, Grimoald I, on 8 May 663.

In commemoration of this victory, the church of Sipontum instituted a special feast on May 8 honoring the Archangel, which then spread throughout Western Christendom during the 9th century. Since the time of Pius V it has been formalized as Apparitio Sancti Michaelis, although it originally did not commemorate the apparition but the victory of the Lombards over invading Greeks.

Pope Gelasius I (reigned 492–496) directed that a basilica should be erected enclosing the space. The Basilica di San Giovanni in Tumba is the final resting-place of the Lombard King Rothari (died 652); the designation "tumba" is now applied to the cupola on squinches.

== History ==
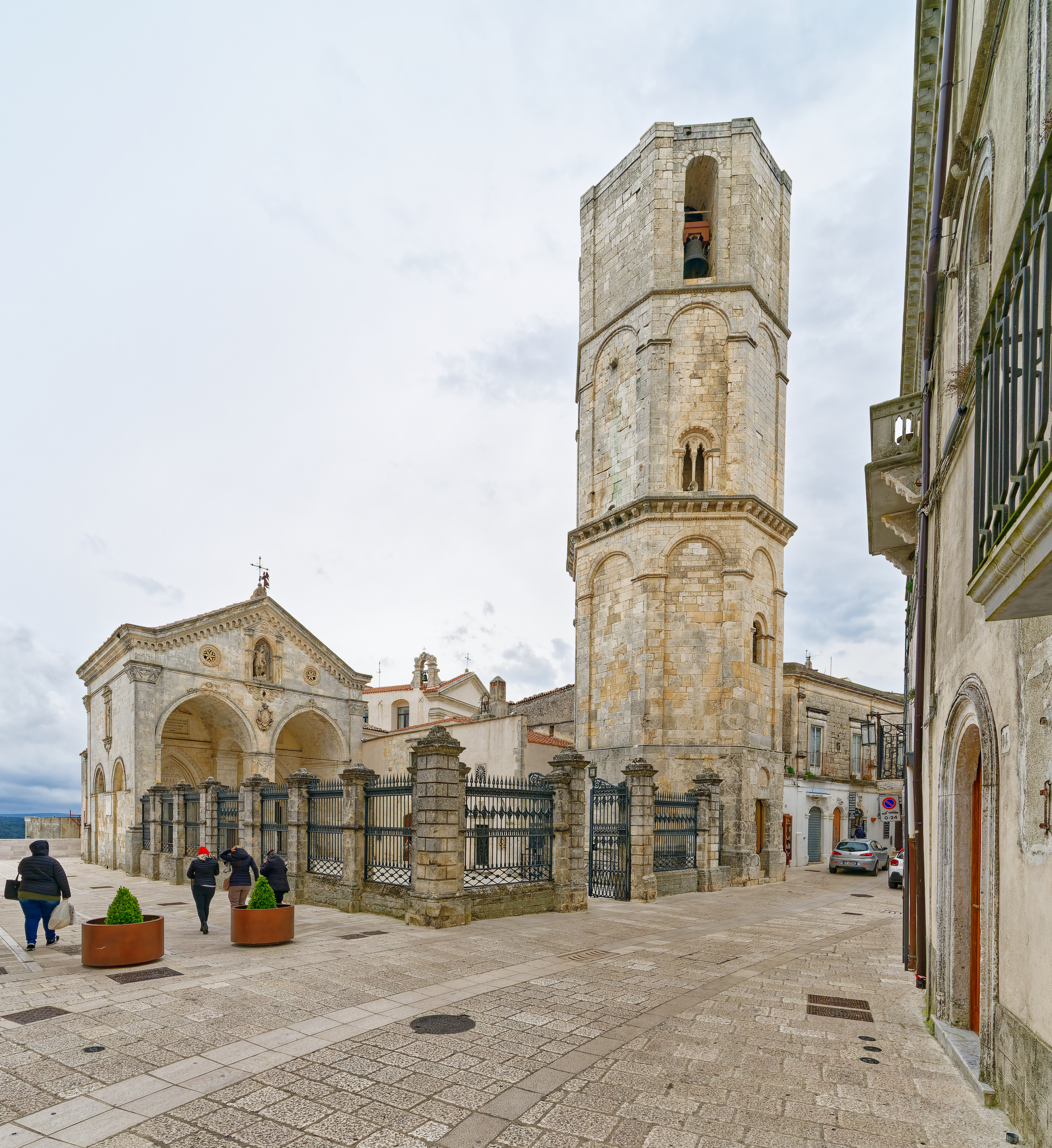
Main entrance of the Sanctuary of Saint Michael the Archangel

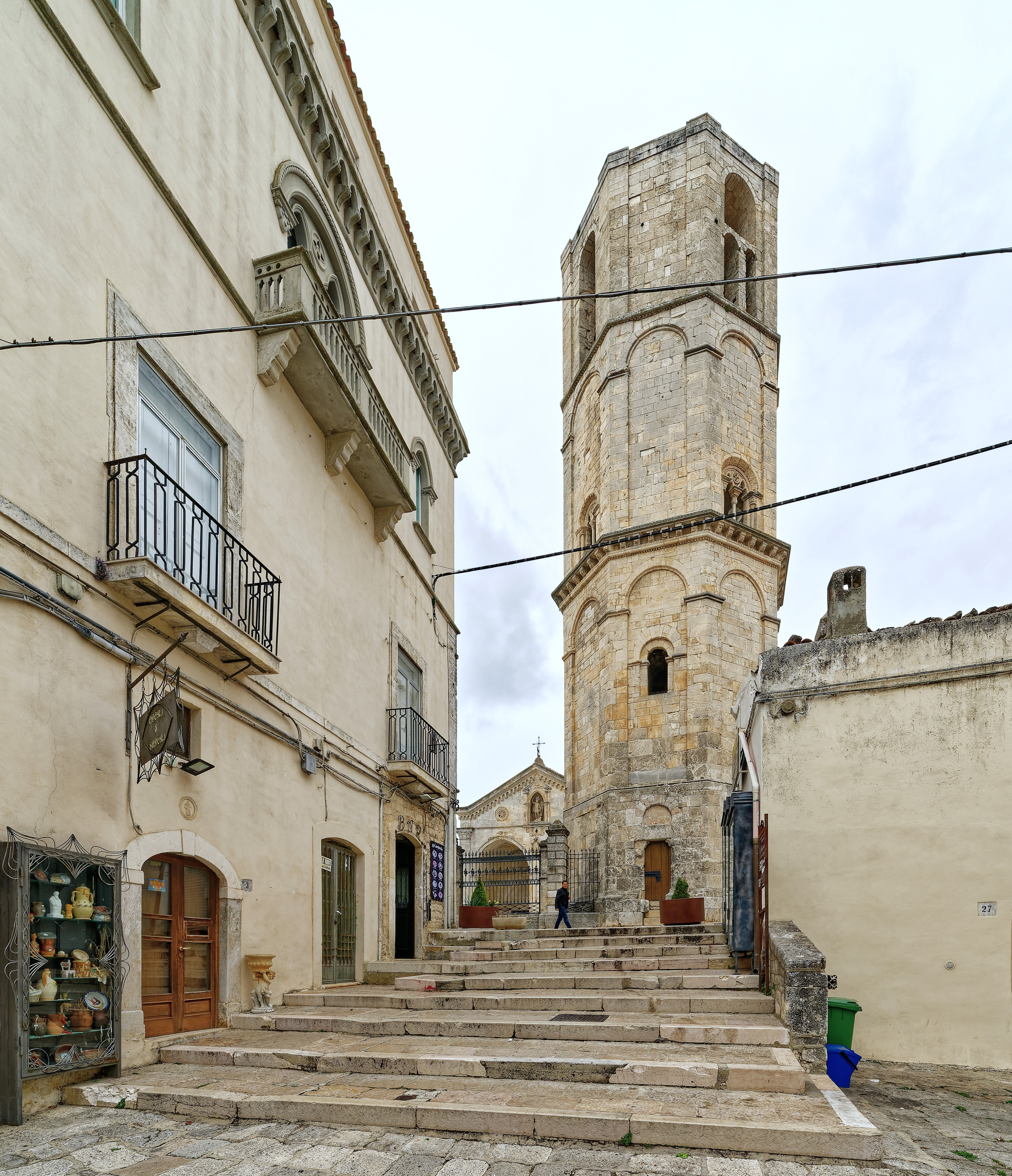
The octagonal (bells) tower of the Sanctuary of Saint Michael the Archangel

The place has been venerated since 490, the year in which, according to tradition, the first apparition of the archangel Michael took place on the Gargano at San Lorenzo Maiorano. A first sanctuary was built in 493 on the cave where the apparition took place and from the 7th century the garganica area in which the sanctuary stood, became part of the Lombards domains as it was included in the territories of the Duchy of Benevento.

The work of conversion of the Lombards from Arian Christianity to Catholic Christianity, already begun in 589 by Queen Theodelinda, was completed under the reign of Cunipert. The cult of St. Michael thus developed within a context of archaic religiosity. Over time, various religious buildings were dedicated to St. Michael, in particular in the territory of the Duchy of Benevento, where the first epicenter of the cult of Michael among the Lombards was the Sanctuary of St. Michael the Archangel and from which it spread throughout the Lombard Kingdom until he was soon considered the patron saint of the entire people.

The Sanctuary of St. Michael the Archangel thus became the main center of veneration of the archangel in the entire West, a typological model for all the others. It was the object of monumental patronage of both the dukes of Benevento and the kings of Pavia, who promoted numerous renovations to facilitate access to the cave of the first apparition and to accommodate pilgrims. The Sanctuary of St. Michael the Archangel thus became one of the main pilgrimage destinations of Christianity, a stop on that variant of the Via Francigena now called Via Sacra Langobardorum that led to Holy Land. In fact, the sanctuary is one of the three major European places of worship named after St. Michael, together with the sacra di San Michele in Val di Susa, and the Mont-Saint-Michel Abbey in Normandy. The alignment of these three geographical sites on a straight line, separated by the same distance. Other further Michael sites would seem to be found extending this line to the northwest and southeast, fueling the legend of the so-called "sacred line of St. Michael the Archangel", which would have it produced by the sword blow inflicted by the Archangel on Satan to send him back to hell as narrated in the Book of Revelation. It is possible that the alignment is a coincidence, favored by the high density of religious buildings that Europe presents and the importance of St. Michael in Christianity.

The sanctuary is connected with the city of Lucca for some important facts, such as the presence of the bishop of Lucca Alfonso Puccinelli, who also witnessed the apparition of St. Michael in 1656. In Lucca, in the church of San Michele in Foro, there is also a statue very similar to the one in the sanctuary of San Michele, donated by Bishop Puccinelli to the Republic of Lucca as a symbol of thanksgiving to the city of origin, after the apparition of 1656.

After the fall of the Lombard Kingdom in 774 the sanctuary retained its important function within the Langobardia Minor, still within the Duchy of Benevento which in that same year was raised, on the initiative of Arechi II, to the rank of principality. When Benevento also fell during the 11th century, the sanctuary of St. Michael the Archangel was taken care of first by the Normans, then by the Swabians and the Angevins, who in turn linked themselves to the cult of Michael and further intervened on the structure of the sanctuary itself, modifying its upper part and enriching it with new decorative apparatus.

== Architecture ==
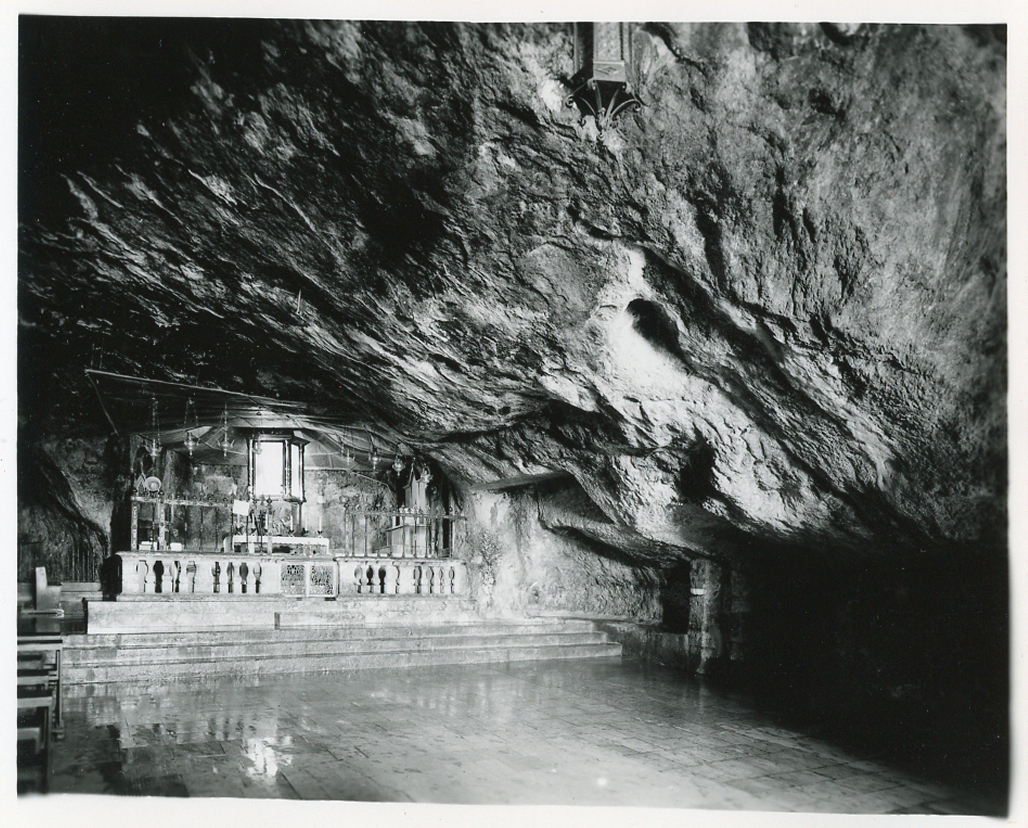
The Saint Michael Archangel grotto in 1965. Photo Paolo Monti

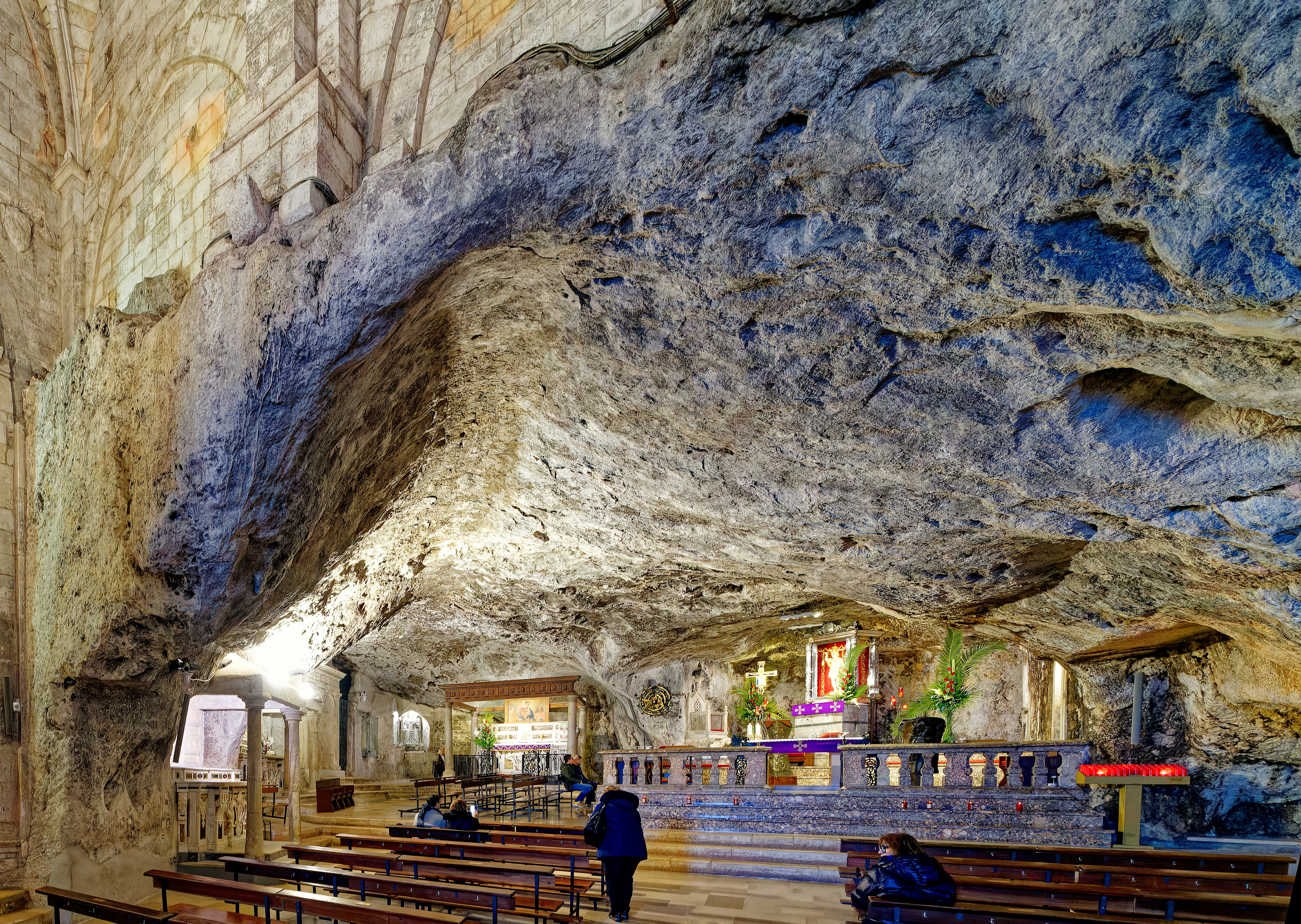
Saint Michael's grotto in 2023.

The complex of buildings consists of the Battistero di San Giovanni in Tumba, damaged in 1942, and the Church of Santa Maria Maggiore. The baptistery presents a rectangular storey on which rests an octagon supporting an elliptical section and a high drum that supports the cupola. The church erected in the eleventh century by Archbishop Leone stands upon the remains of an ancient necropolis. A few remnants attest to its once-rich fresco decoration.

The Castello was enlarged by the Normans upon an episcopal residence of Orso, Bishop of Benevento, to provide a suitable seat for the Honor Montis Sancti Angeli, further modified by Frederick II. The massive, octagonal campanile was built in the late 13th century by Frederick II as a watchtower. It was turned into a bell tower by Charles I of Anjou.

Behind a forecourt the sanctuary presents a portico of two Gothic arches, the right one of 1395 by the local architect Simone, the left one a reconstruction of 1865. From the portico steps lead down to the low arched nave. The cavern can be accessed from a Romanesque portal, called the Portale del Toro ("Gate of the Bull"): the doors, in bronze, were made in Constantinople in 1076, the donation of an Amalfitan noble. They are divided into 24 panels portraying episodes of angels from the Old and New Testaments.

The archaic cavern opening to the left, with its holy well, is full of votive offerings, especially the 12th century marble bishop's throne supported on crouching lions. Among the ex voto objects is a statue of the Archangel by Andrea Sansovino.

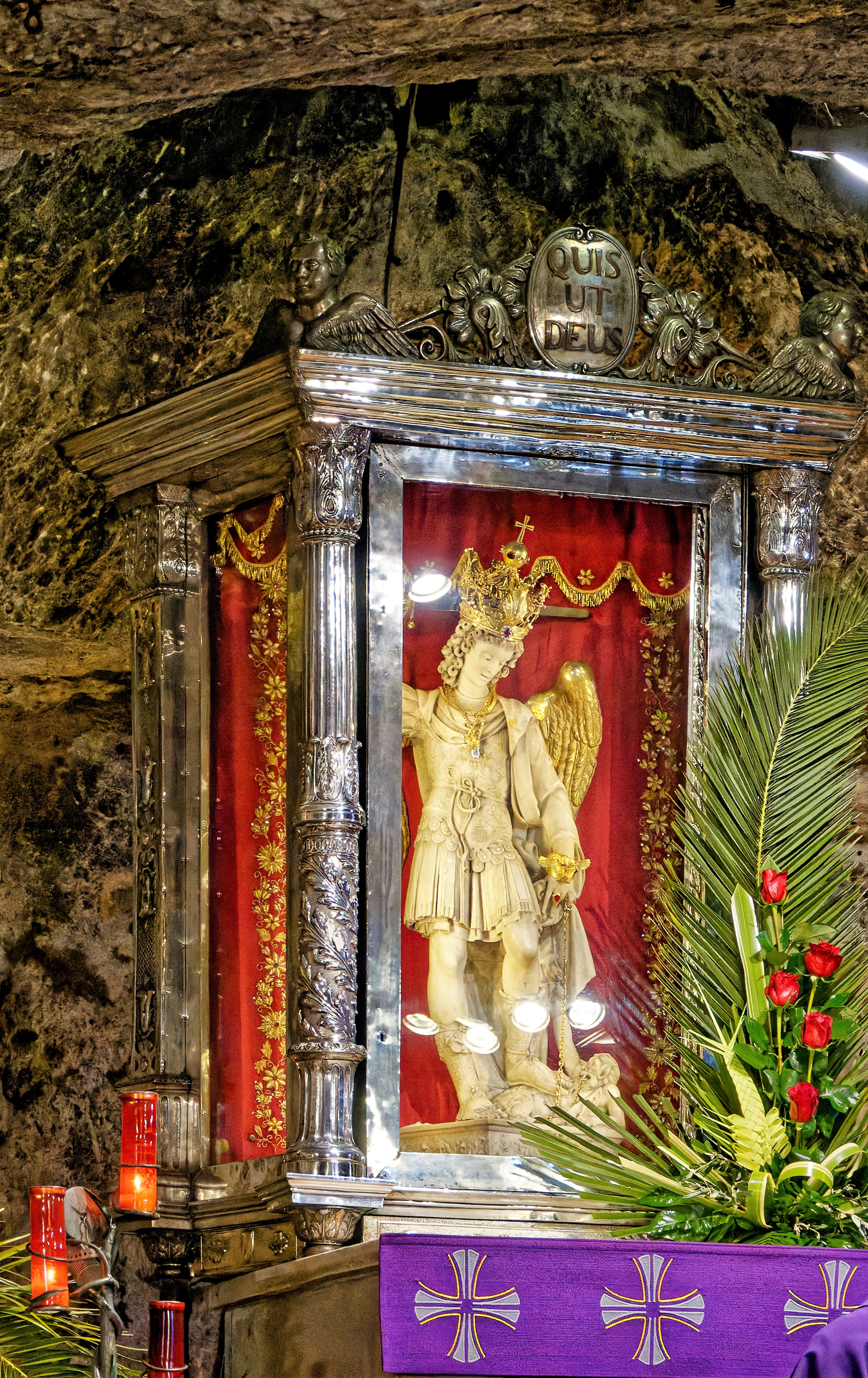
The venerated statue of Saint Michael the Archangel in the main altar of the Sanctuary grotto.

1. The Bell Tower
2. The upper Atrium
3. The staircase
4. The internal atrium
5. The Choir
6. The Chapel of the Cross
7. The Altar of the Blessed Sacrament
8. The Angevin Nave
9. The Cave of San Michele
10. The Episcopal Chair
11. The Altar of Our Lady of Perpetual Help
12. The Crypts
13. The Museum
14. The Stone Quarry

== Pilgrimages ==
Monte Sant'Angelo was a popular pilgrimage site on the way to Jerusalem; pilgrims travelled from as far as Ireland to visit the “Celestial Basilica”. Among the pilgrims who visited the Saint Michael Archangel Sanctuary were many popes (Gelasius I, Leo IX, Urban II, Alexander III, Gregory X, Celestine V, John XXIII as Cardinal, John Paul II), saints (Bridget of Sweden, Bernard of Clairvaux, Thomas Aquinas), emperors, kings, and princes (Louis II of Italy, Otto III, Henry II, Matilda of Tuscany, Charles I of Naples, Ferdinand II of Aragon).

Francis of Assisi also visited the Sanctuary, but, feeling unworthy to enter the grotto, stopped in prayer and meditation at the entrance, kissed a stone, and carved on it the sign of the cross in the form “T” (tau).

== The guardians ==
Since 13 July 1996, the pastoral care of Saint Michael Archangel Sanctuary has been given to the Congregation of Saint Michael the Archangel.

== See also ==
- Saint Michael in the Catholic Church
- Chaplet of Saint Michael the Archangel
- Novena to Saint Michael the Archangel
- Scapular of Saint Michael the Archangel
- Saint Michael's line
