= Chrysolius =

Saint Chrysolius
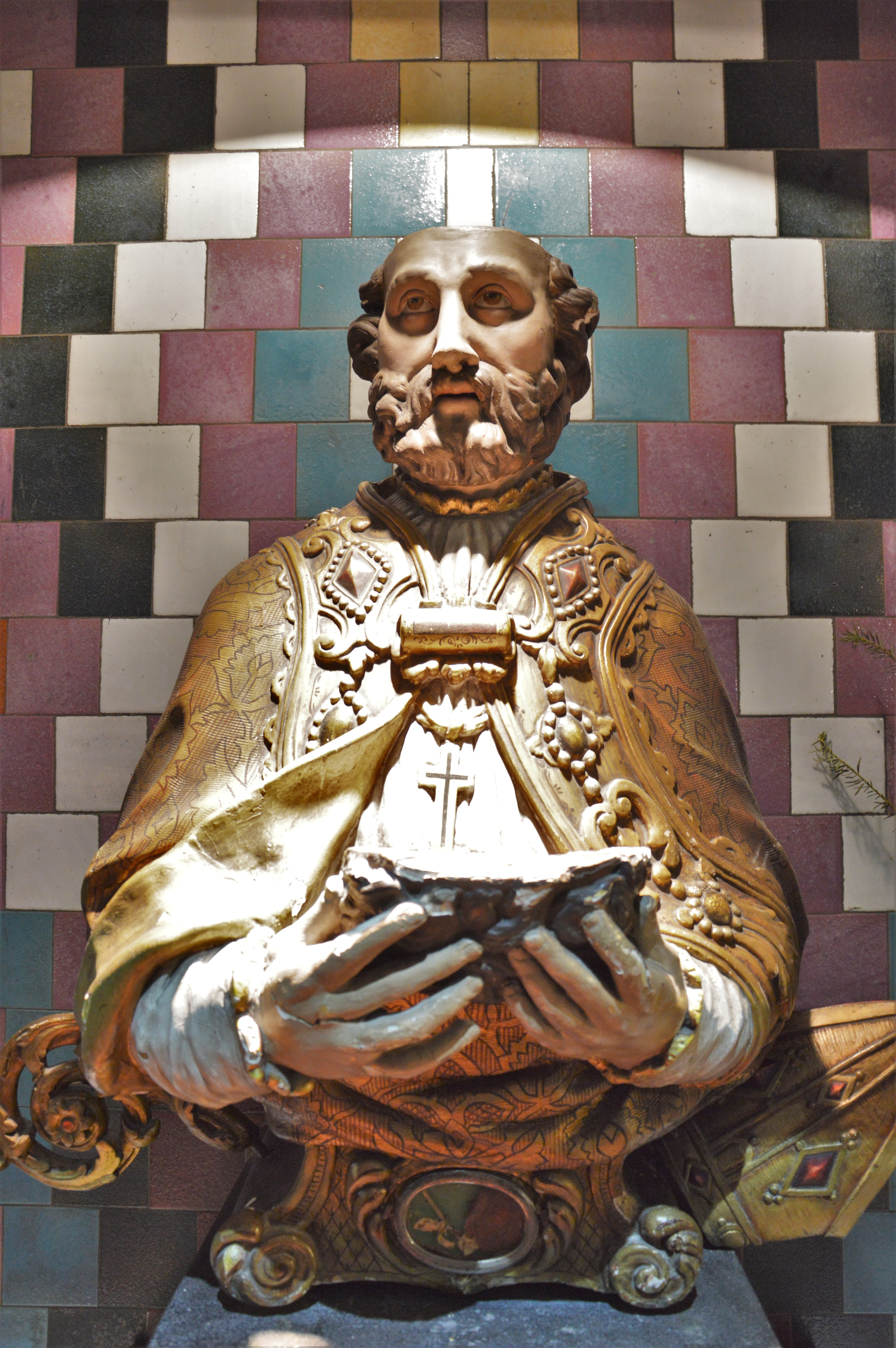

Martyr
- Born: Armenia
- Died: ~300 AD; Belgium
- Venerated in: Roman Catholic Church
- Feast: 7 February
- Patronage: Komen

Saint Chrysolius (French: Chrysole, Chryseuil) the Armenian is the patron saint of Komen/Comines, today in Belgium and France; his relics were venerated in the basilica of St Donatian, Bruges.

== Life ==
According to tradition, he was a native Armenian who fled to Rome during the persecution of Christians by Diocletian, was received by Pope Marcellus I and sent to northeast Gaul, where he evangelized at Verlengehem. According to his legend, he then became a spiritual student of Saint Denis and was sent with Saint Piatus to evangelize the area of Cambrai and Tournai. Chrysolius then became a bishop and was subsequently stopped by Roman soldiers and condemned to be decapitated; the top of his skull was sliced off. According to his legend, the piece of his skull broke into three smaller pieces, and where each piece fell, a miraculous spring gushed out. Chrysolius, after recovering the top of his cranium, walked to Komen and died there, after crossing the ford at the river Deûle that now bears his name.

== Veneration ==
The waters of the springs where pieces of his head are said to have fallen were believed to cure ailments of the throat and eyes.

The rosette in the façade of the church of Saint-Vaast at Wambrechies depicts Chrysolius, along with saints Hubert, Benedict, and Bernard.

The church of Saint-Chrysole was rebuilt in neo-Byzantine style between 1922 and 1929, after its predecessor was destroyed in World War I.

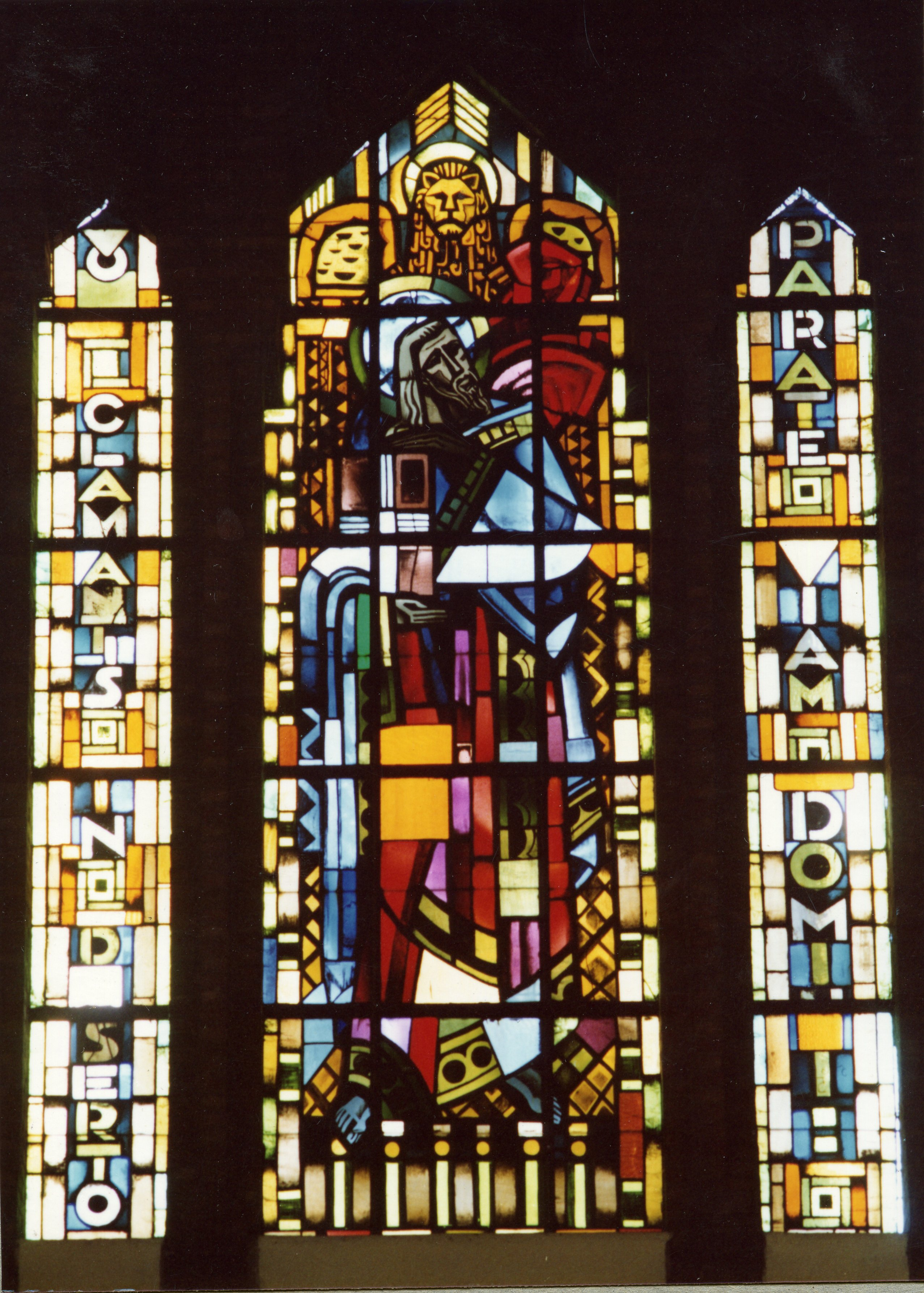
Church of St.-Chrysole, Komen

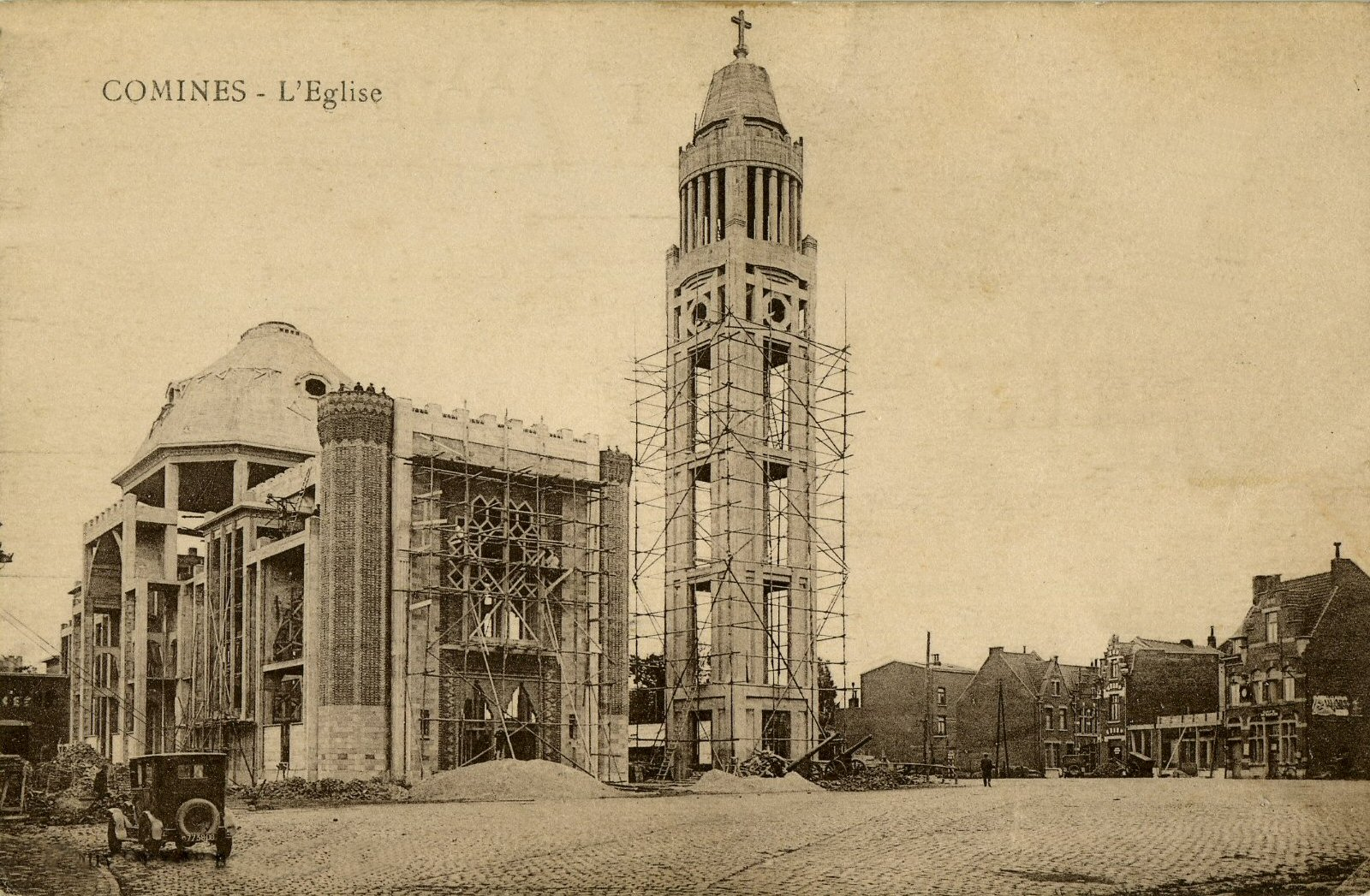
Construction of the church of St.-Chrysole, Komen

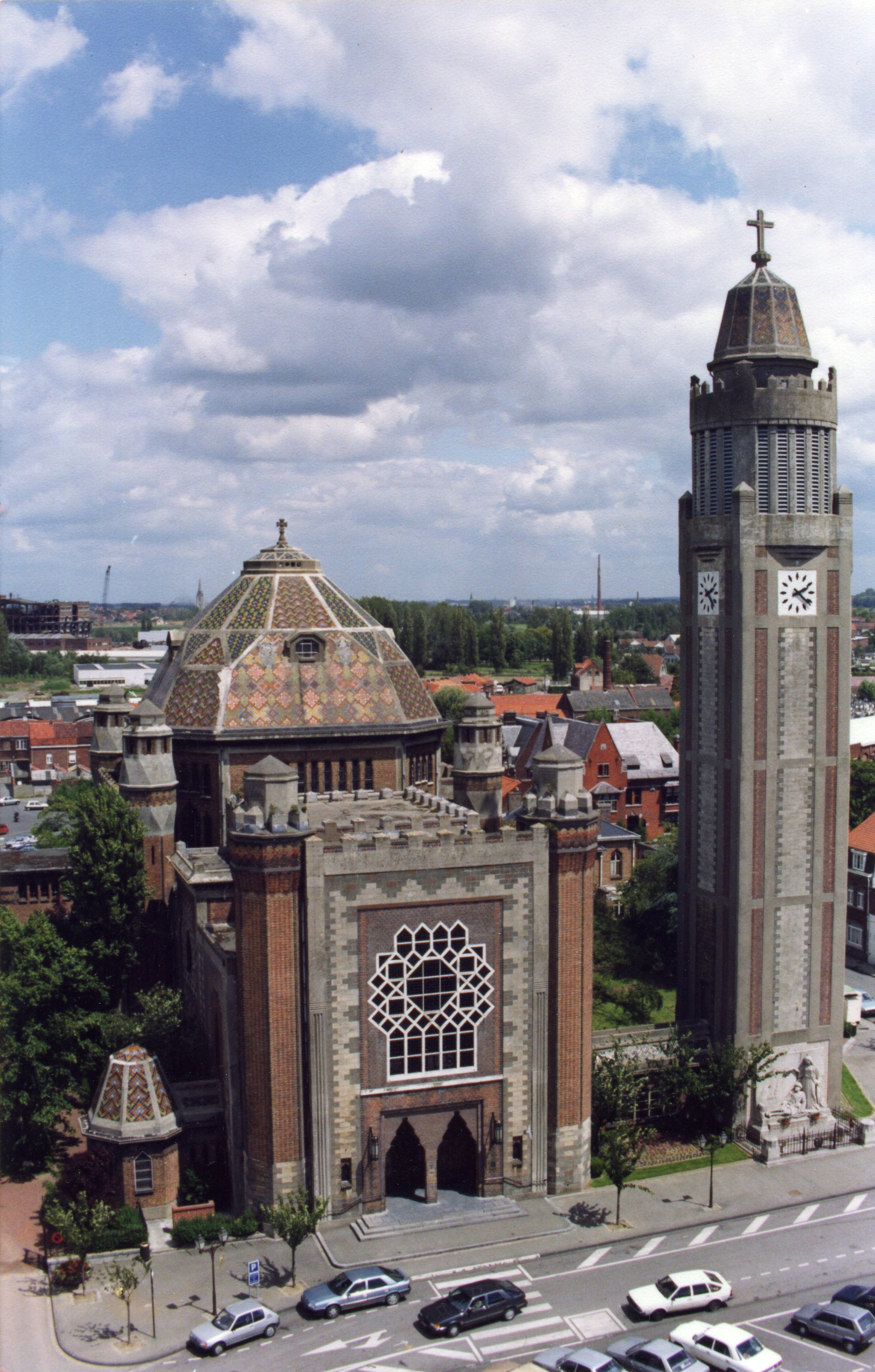
Church of St.-Chrysole, Komen

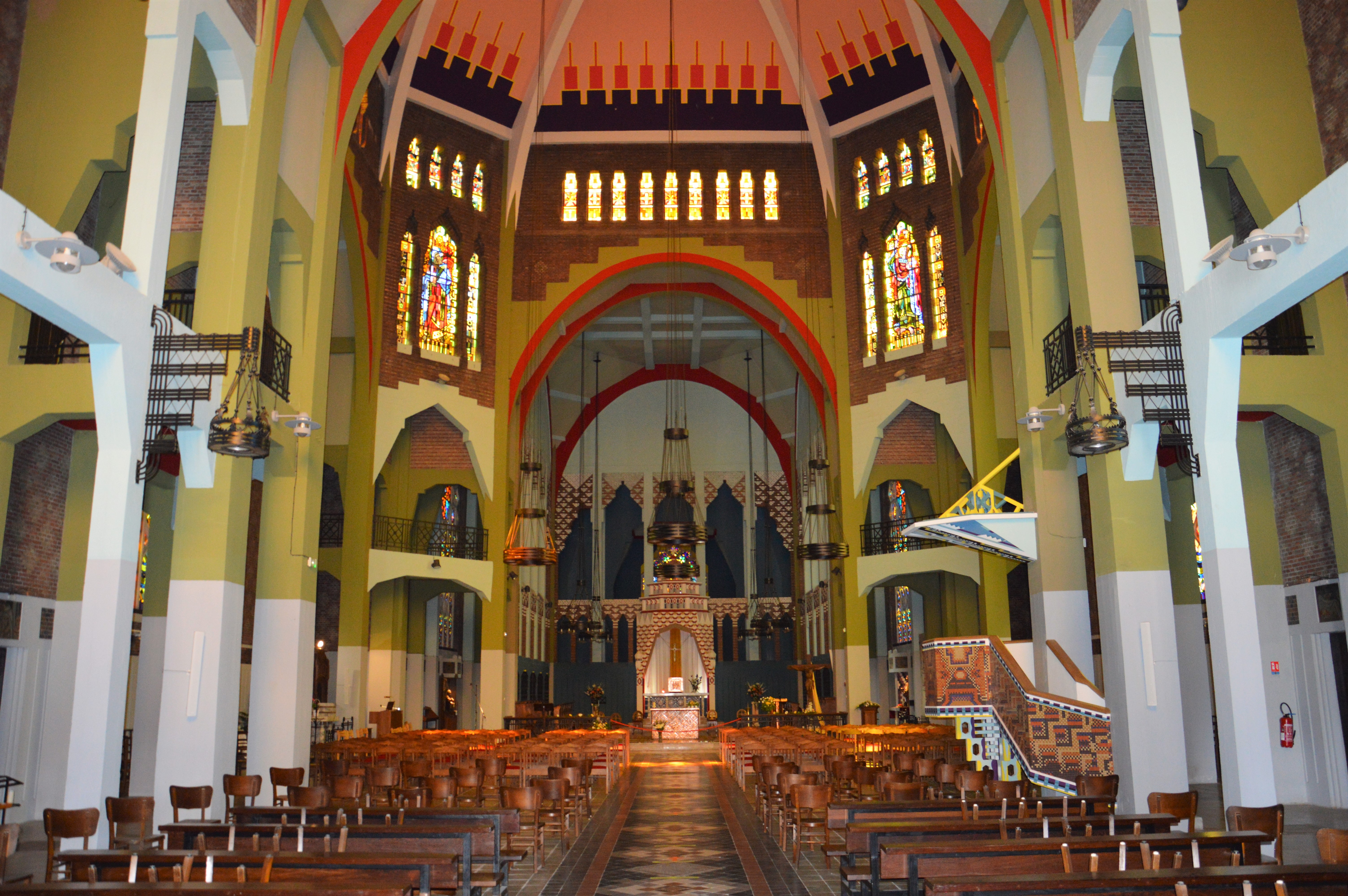
St Chrysole, Komen. interior

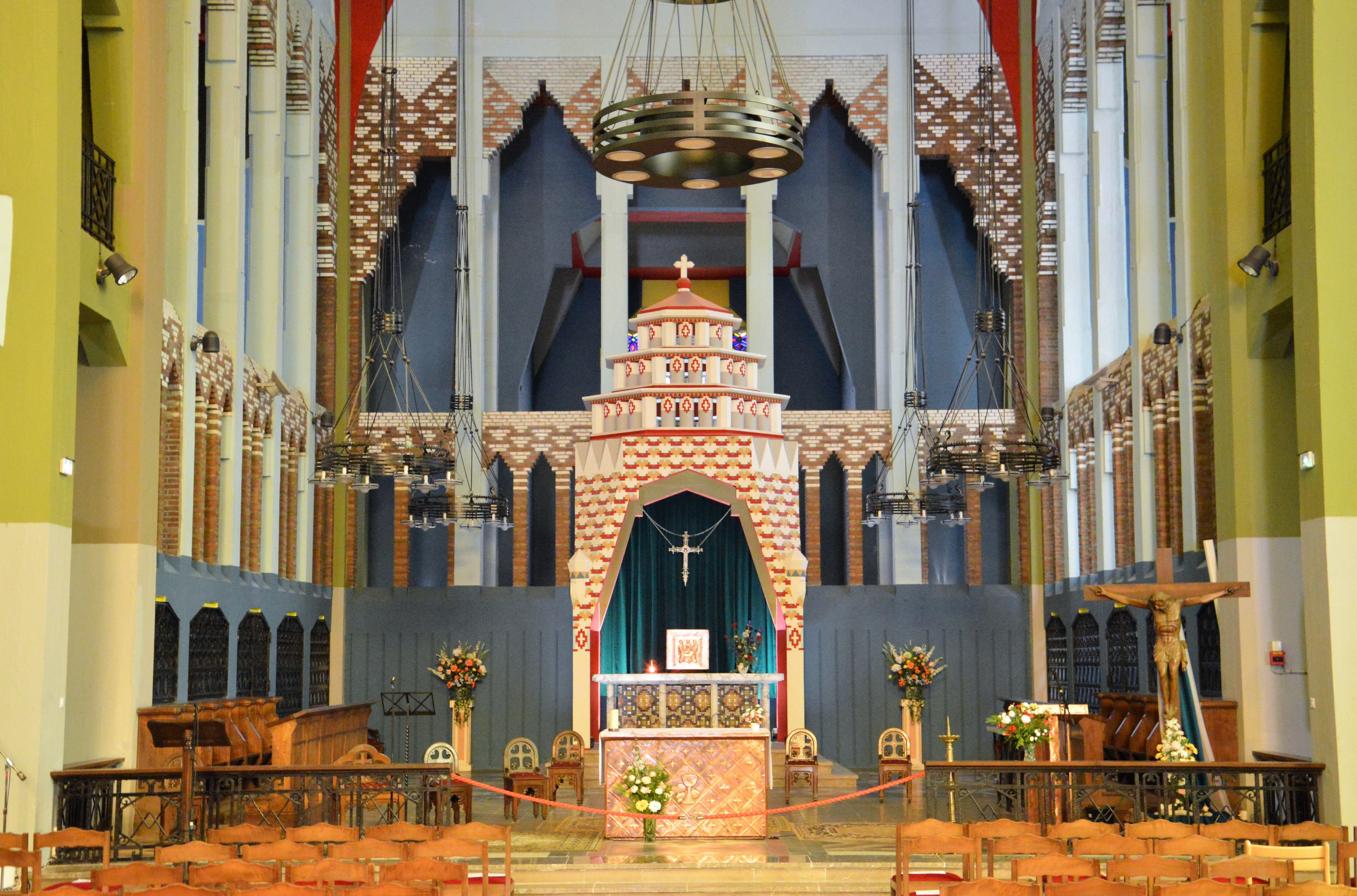
St Chrysole, Komen. interior

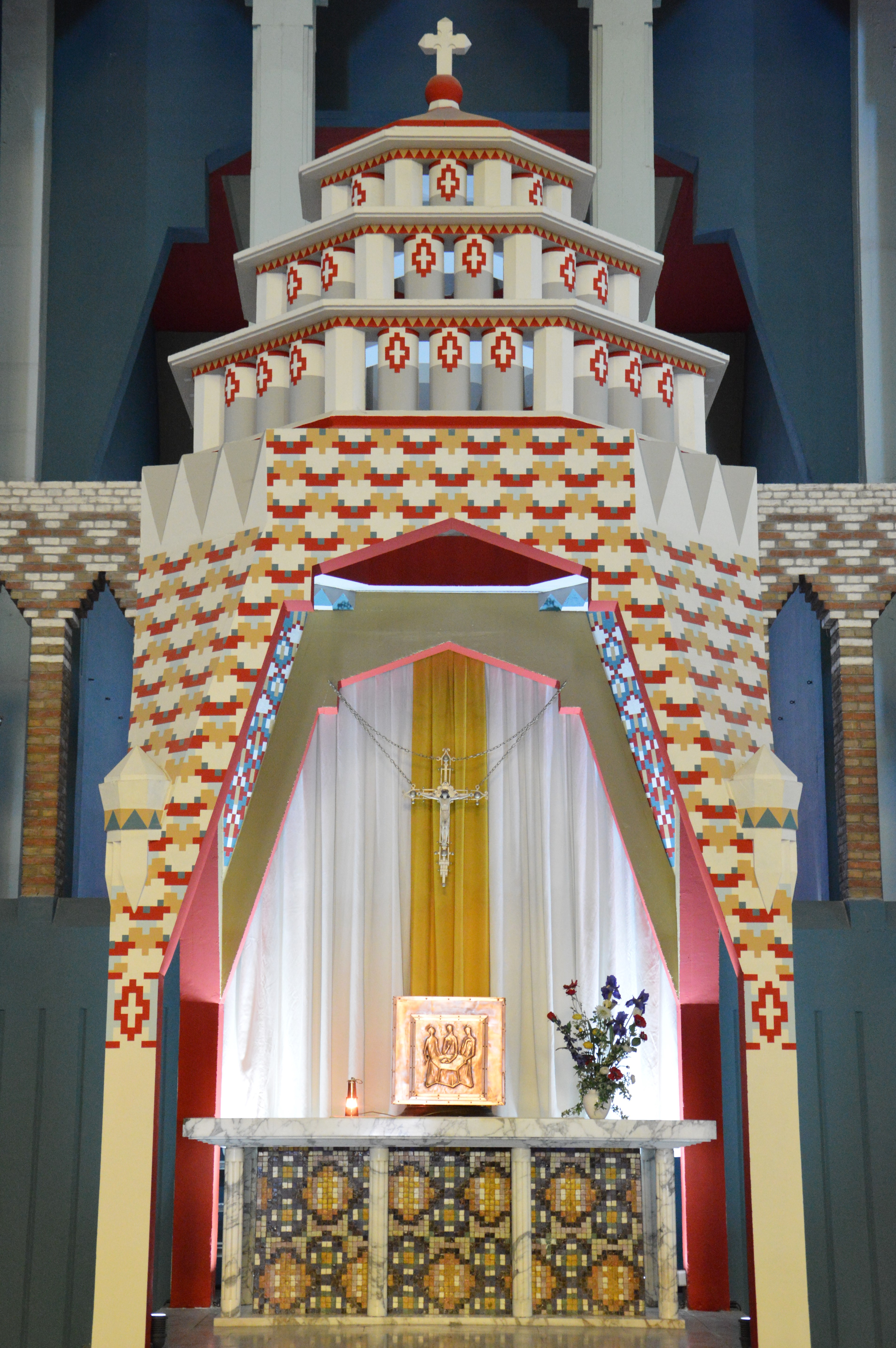
St Chrysole, Komen. Altar and ciborium

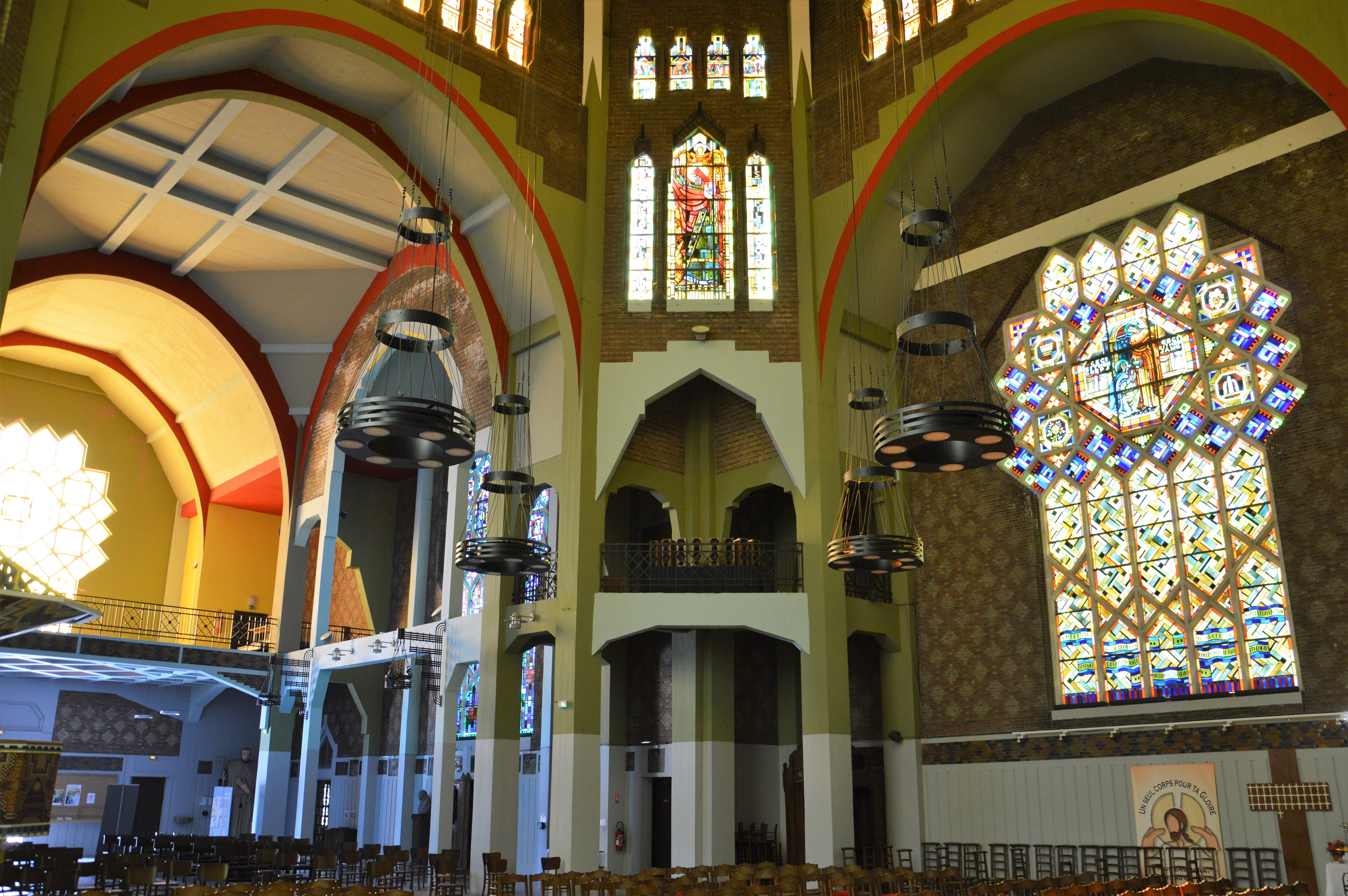
St Chrysole, Komen. interior
