= Liber de apparitione Sancti Michaelis =

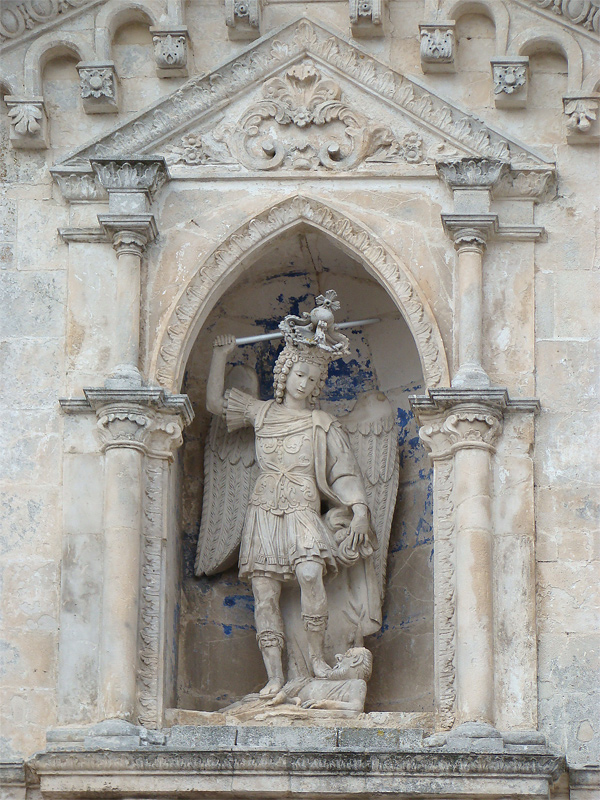
Statue of Saint Michael overlooking the entrance of the Sanctuary.

The Liber de apparitione Sancti Michaelis in Monte Gargano (Bibliotheca Hagiographica Latina 5948) is a composite 9th century hagiographical text by an anonymous author containing the foundation myth of the Sanctuary of Monte Sant'Angelo, also known as Mont Gargano, on Mount Gargano, Italy, in northern Apulia. It contains record of the first known apparition of Saint Michael the Archangel in western Europe after the transmission of his cult from the Greek East.

== Manuscript tradition ==
The earliest extant manuscripts of the De apparitione are from the late eighth or early ninth century, but the tripartite composition of the text suggests at least three layers of narrative accretion; the oldest strata seems to go back to a lost sixth century version, which the author of the anonymous final version mentions in his recension.

== Legend ==
There are three sections to the legend, recording three apparitions by Michael on Mount Gargano. The first and third sections appear to be part of the same narrative, while the second is possibly the account of a battle half a century later. According to the first and last parts of the legend, around the year 490 the Archangel Michael appeared several times to the Bishop of Sipontum near a cave in the mountains, instructing that the cave be dedicated to Christian worship and promising protection of the nearby town of Sipontum from pagan invaders. These apparitions are the first appearances of Saint Michael in western Europe.

The second section of the text describes Michael's intercession on behalf of the Sipontans and the Beneventans against invading pagan Neapolitans. Michael strikes the pagans with lightning, killing over 600 of them, and the Sipontans and Beneventans are victorious. Giorgio Otranto identifies this battle as the one recorded in Book 4 of Paul the Deacon's History of the Lombards, which describes the defense of the oraculum on Mount Gargano against 'Greeks'– Byzantine Neapolitan troops– by the Lombard Duke of Benevento, Grimoald I, on May 8, 663.

Richard Johnson summarises the legend:

- "Garganus, a wealthy man of Siponto who owned a large herd of cattle, became enraged with a bull that had strayed from his herd. When he found the bull at the mouth of the cave, he shot it with a poisoned arrow which reversed its trajectory in mid-flight and killed him. Hearing of this mysterious event, the archbishop instructed the local citizens to fast for three days. During the course of the fast, St Michael appeared to the bishop and revealed to him the significance of the event.
- At this point in the hagiographical account, the narrative of Garganus and the bull is interrupted, and the account of St. Michael's military intervention on behalf of the Christians of Siponto is taken up. According to this part of the legend, the Sipontans and their neighbors, the Beneventans, were besieged by the pagan Neapolitans. In despair, the Sipontans turned to their bishop for help. The bishop instructed them to perform a three-day fast and to pray for protection from St. Michael. The archangel appeared to this bishop and assured him of their victory over the pagans. The Neapolitans were defeated and as a sign of his aid in their victory, St. Michael left the mark of his footprints in the stone of the cave where Garganus had been killed.
- After the description of the archangel's military intervention, the hagiographical narrative returns to the scene of the grotto and gives an account of his third apparition. The Sipontans, in great doubt and fear as to whether they dare enter the grotto, consulted their bishop again. A third time, St. Michael appeared to the bishop and told him that there was no need to consecrate the grotto chapel since he had already done so. St. Michael instructed the bishop to enter the chapel first and conduct mass. In the cavern, he discovered an altar, covered with a red cloth. The bishop then appointed priests and psalm-singers to conduct daily services in the grotto-chapel. The account of the "discovery" of the grotto-chapel ends with a description of the clear and sweet water which seeped from the ceiling stone beyond the altar. When drunk from the glass vessel suspended by a silver chain near the source, the dripping water heals all manner of infirmities. The hagiographic account of St. Michael's three apparitions on Monte Gargano ends with St. Paul's observation on the function of angels (Hebrews 1:14): "For angels are ministering spirits and sent to minister for them who will receive the inheritance of salvation."

== Other records of the legend ==
The legend of the Archangel's apparition at Gargano is also recorded in the Roman Breviary for May 8, as well as in the Golden Legend (Legenda Aurea), the compendium of Christian hagiographies compiled by Jacobus de Voragine between 1260-1275. Its presence in the Golden Legend ensured its wide circulation in medieval Europe. This foundation myth may have influenced those of other Michaeline sanctuaries, such as the Revelatio Ecclesiae de Sancti Michaelis of Mont Saint-Michel.
