= Saint Michael's line =

Postulated Eurasian line and English ley line

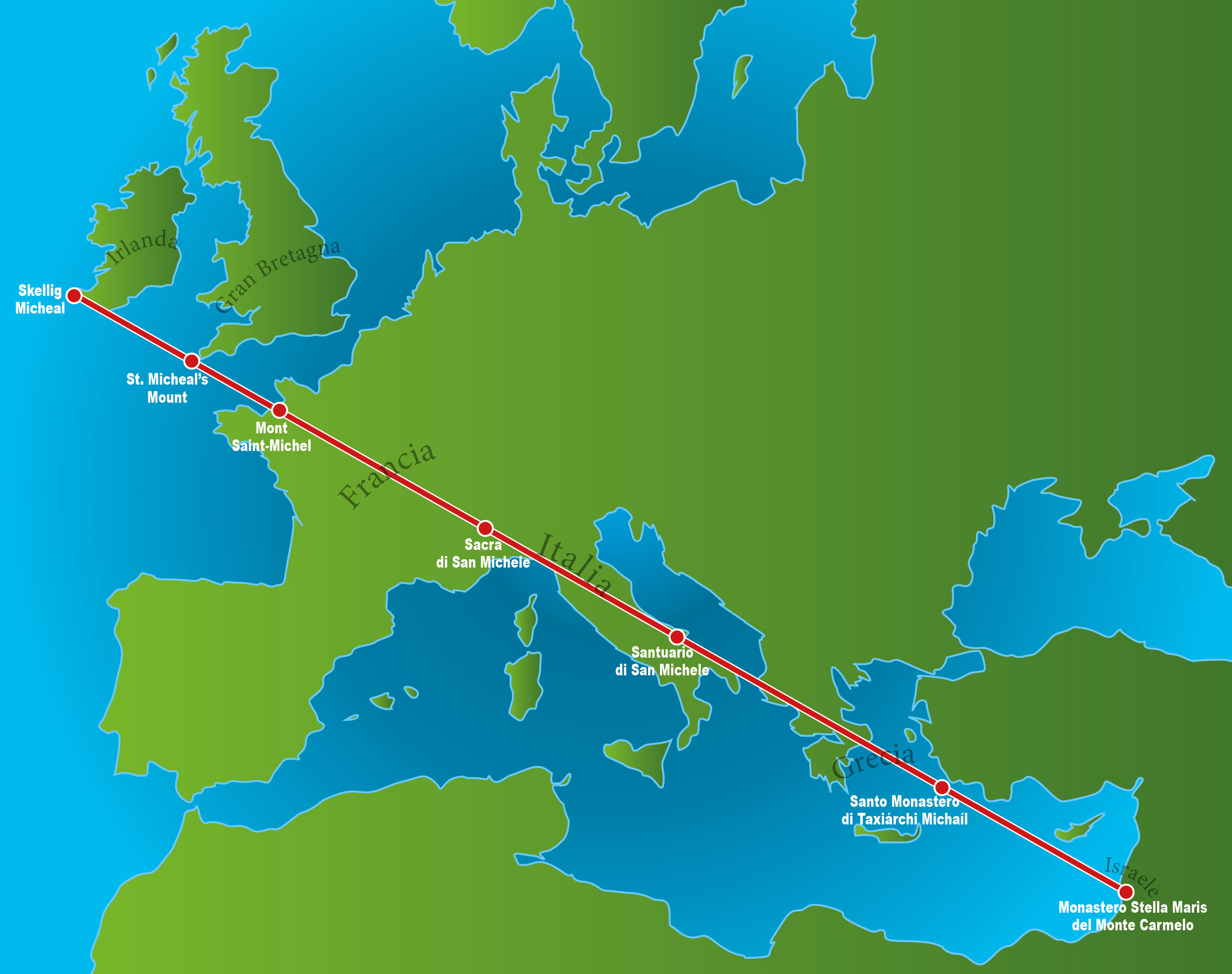
Saint Michael's line

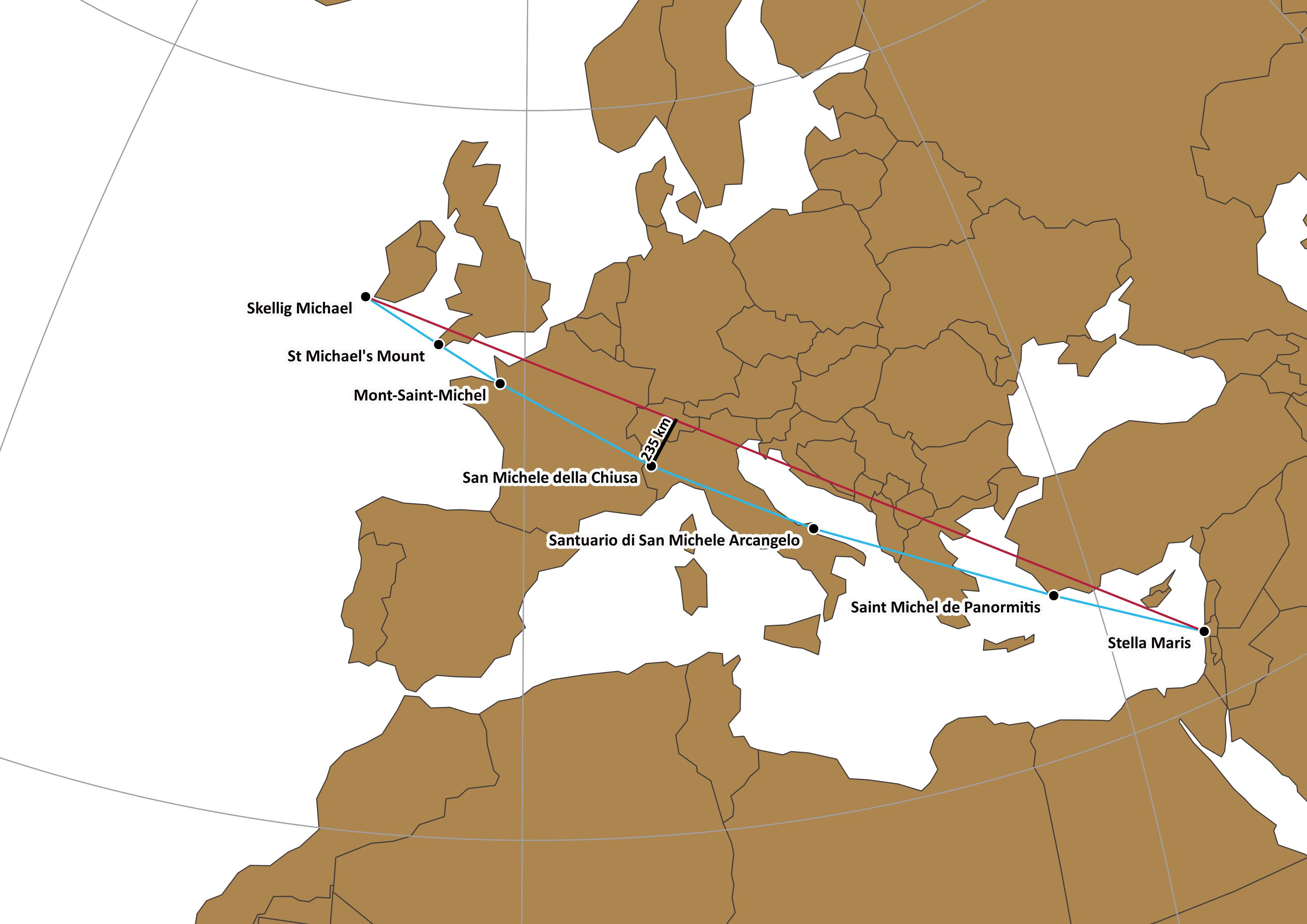
Comparison of Saint Michael's line with a straight line on the great circle between its end points

Saint Michael's line or the Sword of Saint Michael, also known as the Sacred Line of Saint Michael or the St Michael-Apollo Axis, is a straight line (a loxodrome or connected series of rhumb-lines) formed by transecting monasteries and churches in Europe and the Holy Land, eight of which are dedicated to the Archangel Michael. Several other notable sites on the same line in Greece are associated with ancient temples to Apollo.

Saint Michael's Line is also the name of a different postulated ley line in England, part of the Mary and Michael Pilgrim's Way.

== History ==
=== Ancient Greece ===
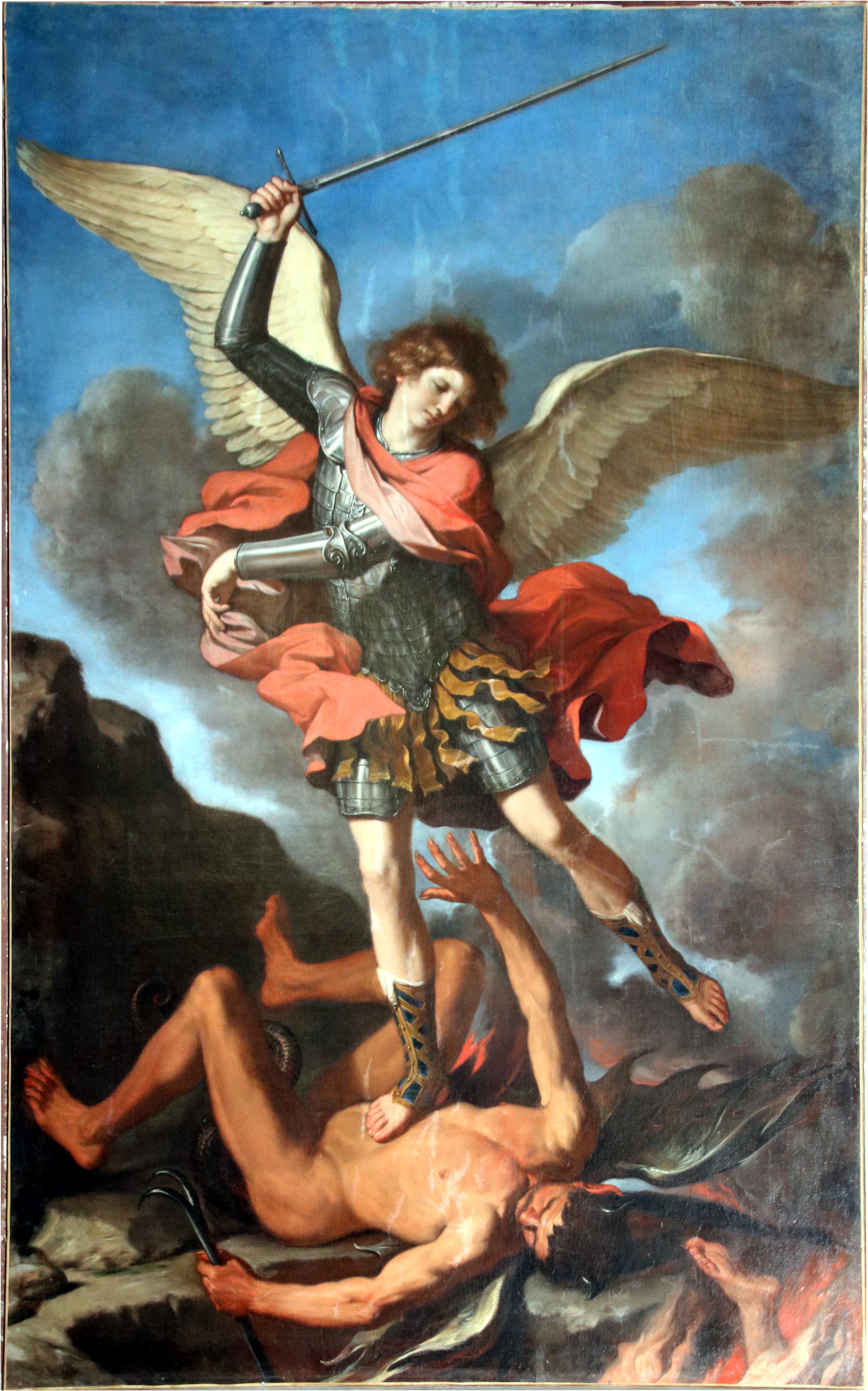
Saint Michael the Archangel

French academic Jean Richer (universitaire) published a book Géographie sacrée du monde grec (Hachette, 1967) which claimed several geographical alignments between ancient Greek temples. One of these was the Kerkyra-Delphi-Athens-Delos axis, intersecting temples at those locations mostly related to Apollo. In 1977, Richer's brother Julian noted that the line, when extended West and East, cross several other cultic locations, calling it the St Michael-Apollo axis.

=== Western Europe ===
Like many places dedicated to St. Michael, the aligned sites are almost all located on prominent hilltops or other hard to reach places, and include Skellig Michael, St Michael's Mount, Mont Saint-Michel, the Sacra di San Michele, the Church of the Archangel Michael on the Isola Maggiore on the Lake Trasimeno, San Michele Arcangelo, and the Sanctuary of Monte Sant'Angelo. The details of this alignment are also astonishing: the three most important sites, Mont Saint-Michel in France; Sacra di San Michele in Val di Susa and Sanctuary of Monte Sant'Angelo in Gargano, are equidistant from each other.

=== Eastern Mediterranean ===
The line also transects the Panormitis Monastery of the Archangel Michael on Symi Island, and conventionally terminates at the Stella Maris Monastery on Mount Carmel in Israel.

== Coincidence and linearity ==
There are a great number of churches and sites devoted to St Michael the Archangel across Europe: see this map. The chances that an arbitrary line would transect multiple of the lesser sites is high.

In a 2016 blog post, astrophysicist Luca Amendola noted that the St Michael-Apollo axis could be characterized as a loxodrome of 60 degrees, which could be calculated using navigation or surveying technology known in antiquity. His private calculations of these rhumb-lines between both Richer's Apollo-cultic sites and the St Michael-cultic sites suggested a strong linearity, with a best-fit at 60.45 degrees: commenting "Compared to the distance from Skellig to Carmel, 4190 km, a deviation of an average 14 km and a maximum of 42 km is indeed astonishing."

For the three major sites on the line, Sanctuary of Monte Sant'Angelo, Gargano, was established around 500AD, and Mont-Saint-Michel was established around 708AD. A pilgrimage route between the two started. Various sources suggest that the Sacra in Piedmont, built in the years around 1000AD, was deliberately sited to be exactly halfway between the other two major sites dedicated to the archangel: as the midpoint on a pilgrimage trail the la Via dell'Angelo (or Via Sancti Michaelis). Other churches en route were dedicated to St Michael, trying to reproduce the success of the Gargano cult tradition and to meet the devotional interests of pilgrims.

For notional end points of the line, the monastery of Skellig Island, established by at least the eighth century, became associated with St Michael by the tenth century. However Mount Carmel and the Stella Maris monastery have no known historic or mythic connection with the archangel.

== Legends ==
Some of these locations may have had a prior connection to pagan sites of worship, whose cults were re-channeled into Christianized forms. Like Mont Saint-Michel, Sacra di San Michele and the Sanctuary of Monte Sant'Angelo are reported to have been constructed at the behest of St. Michael himself.

According to legend, the Sacred Line of Saint Michael represents the blow the Saint inflicted upon the Devil when he cast him into Hell, as per the story of the Fall of Satan.

A Ukrainian folk legend says that St. Michael gave thunder to the Prophet Elijah on the top of Mount Carmel, so that he could fight the prophets of Baal.

== Gallery ==
The Sword of Saint Michael
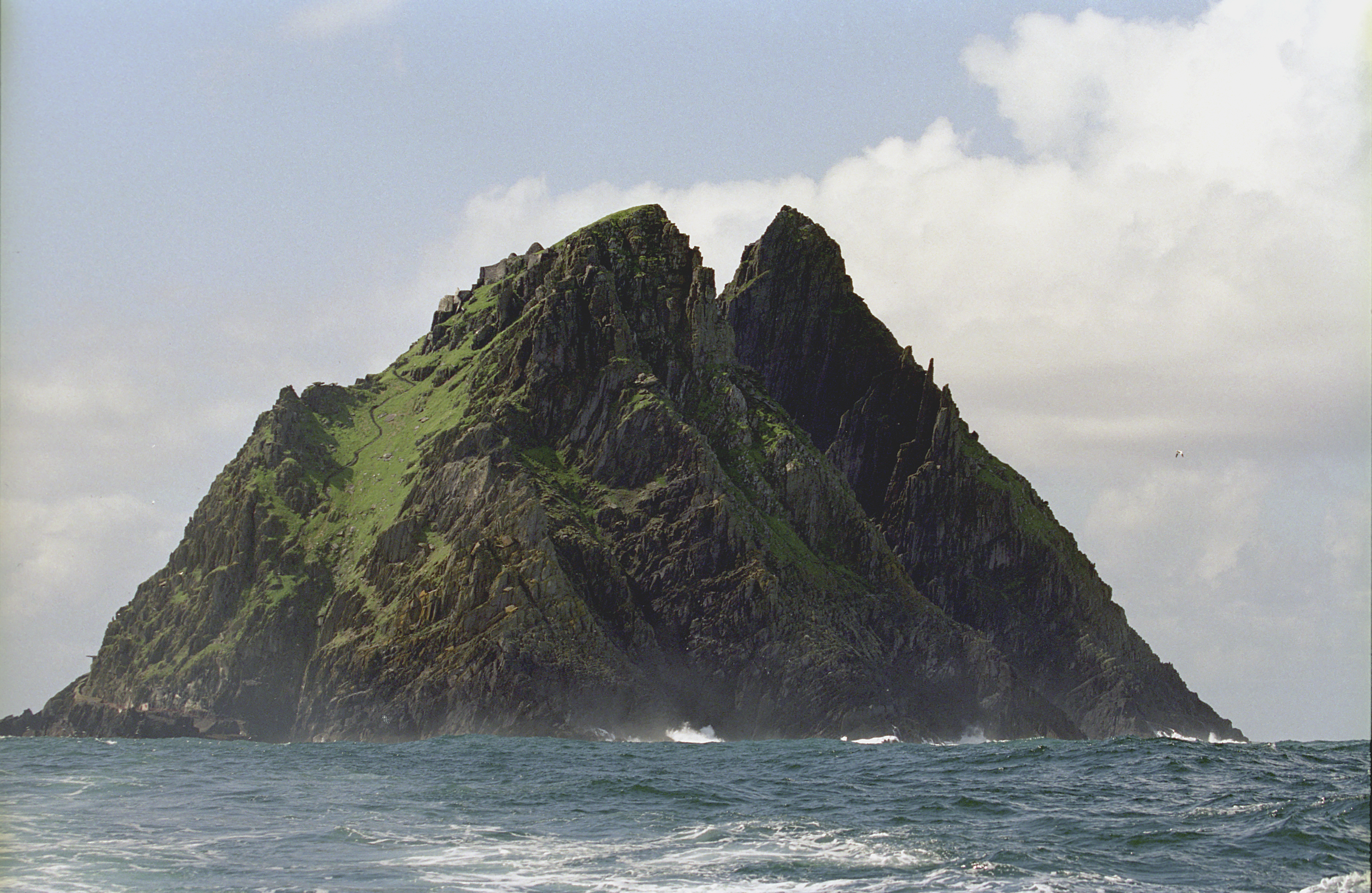
Skellig Michael (County Kerry, Ireland)

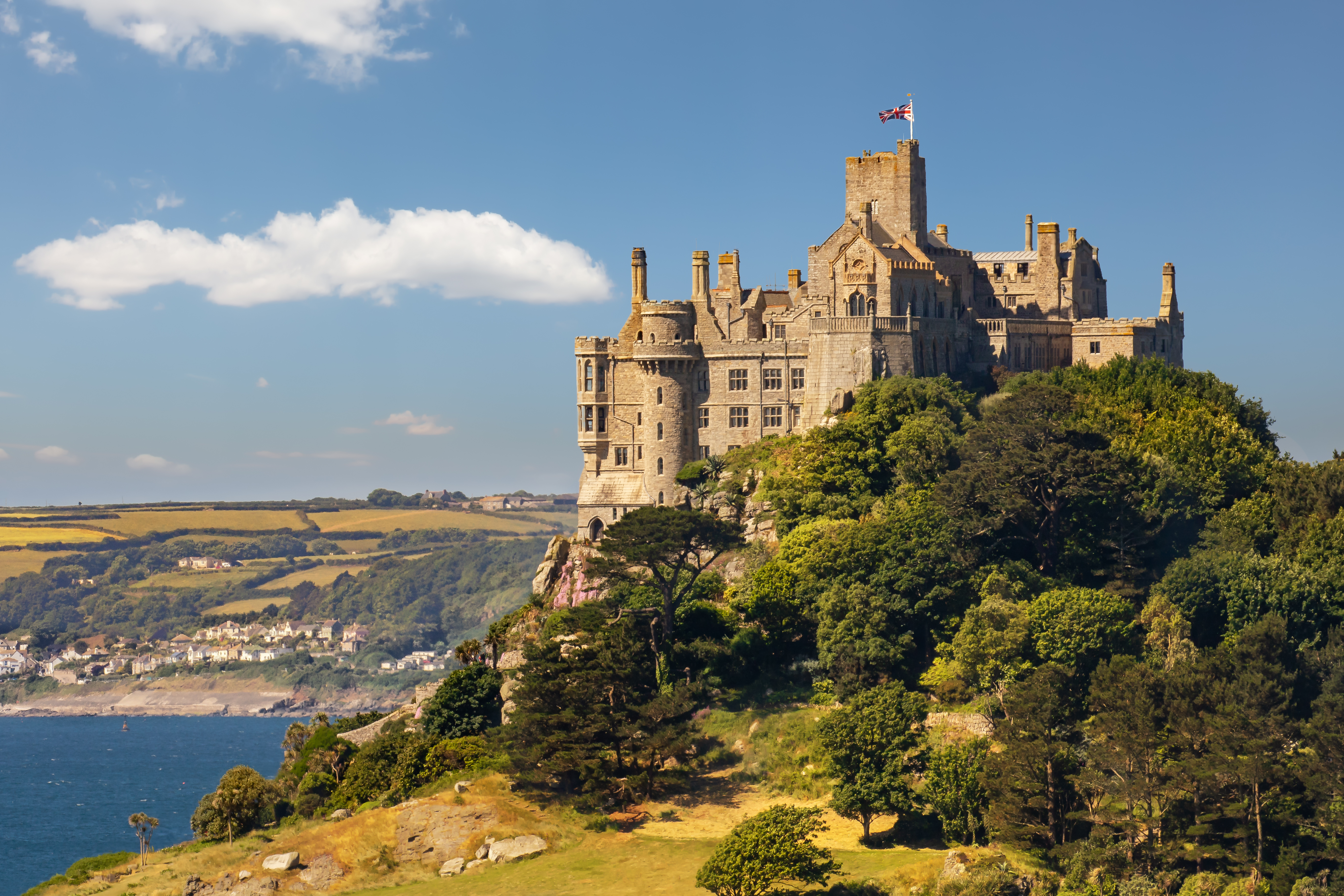
St Michael's Mount (Cornwall, England)

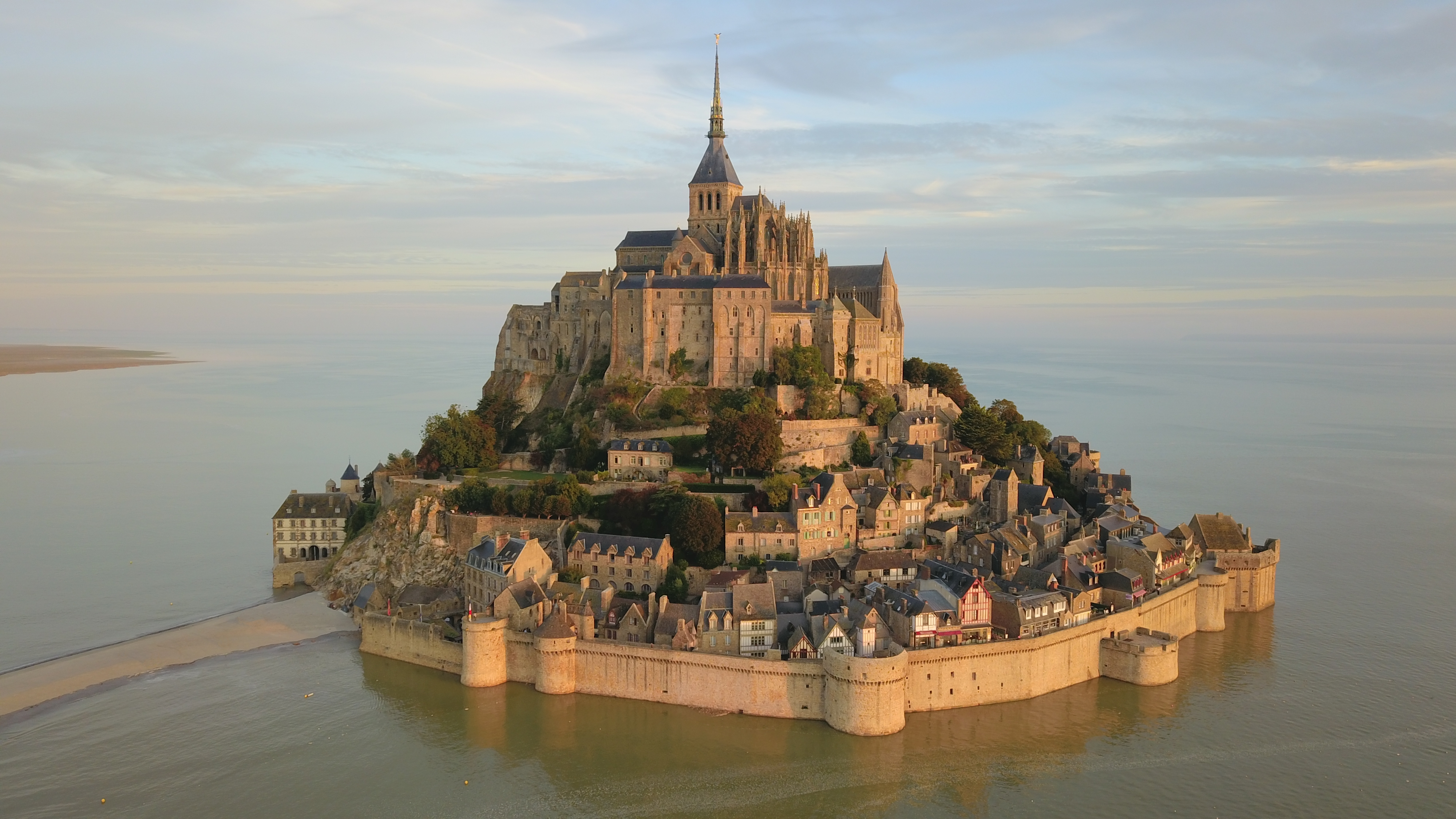
Mont-Saint-Michel (Normandy, France)

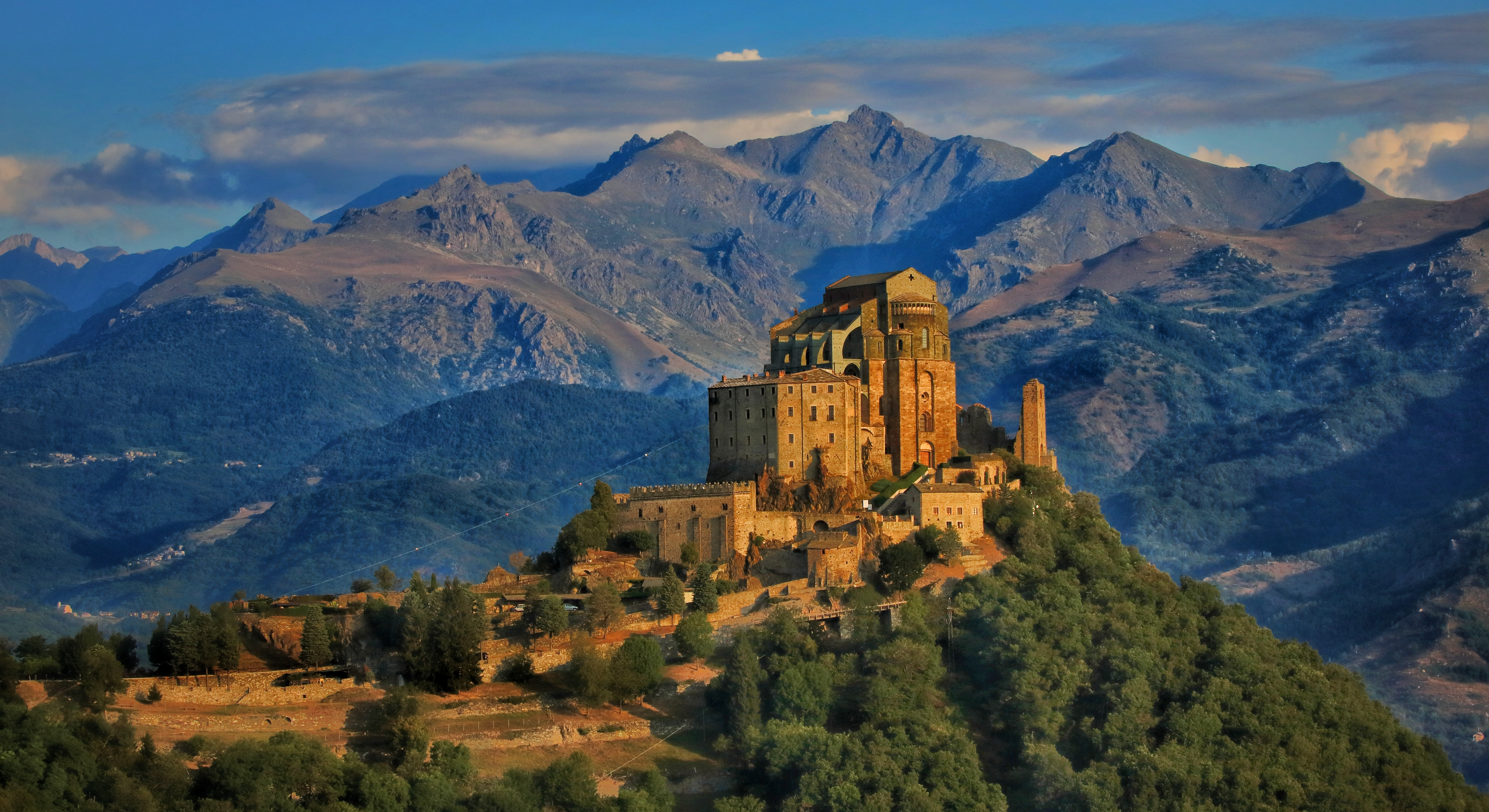
Sacra di San Michele (Piedmont, Italy)

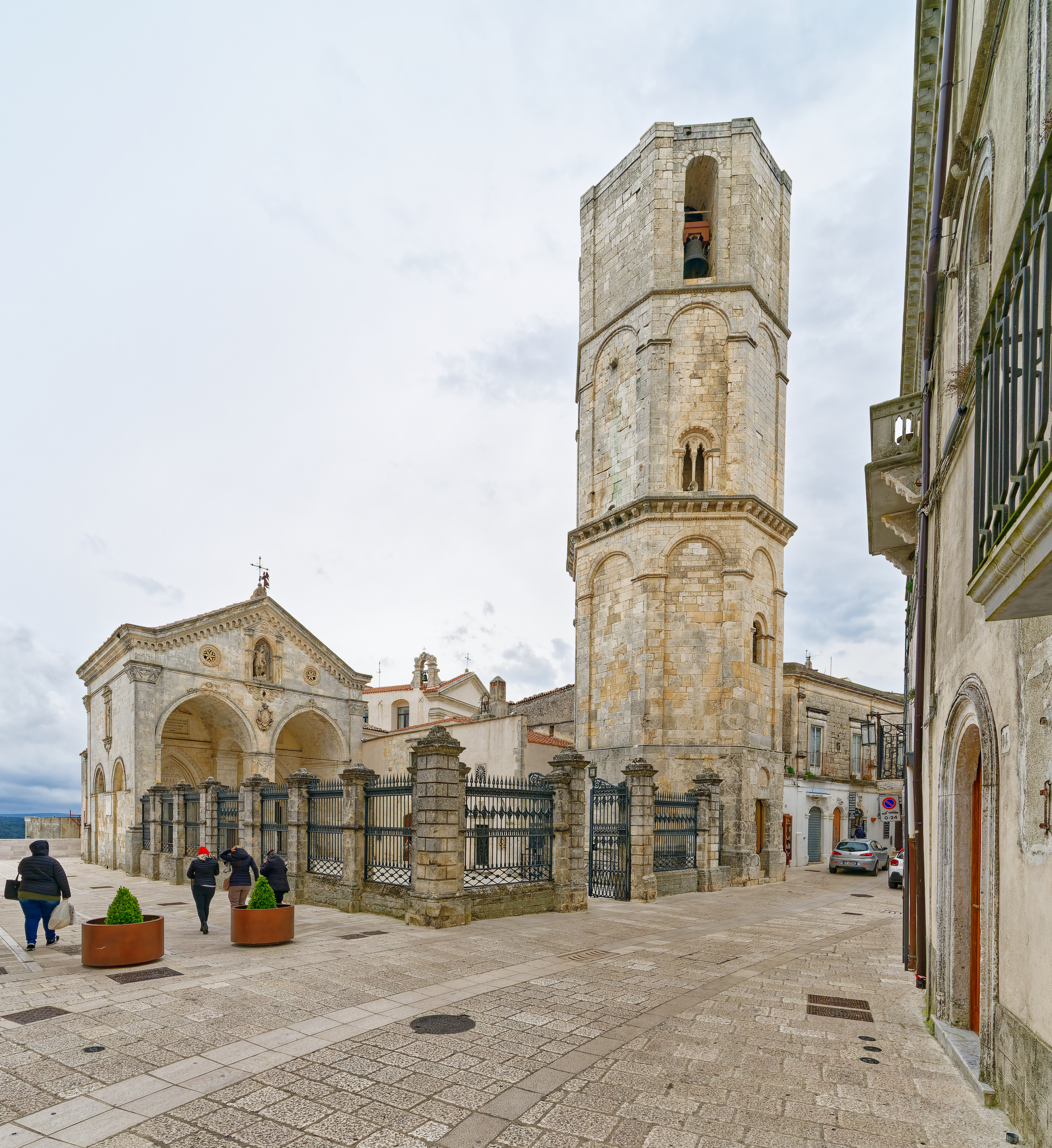
Santuario di San Michele Arcangelo (Gargano, Italy)

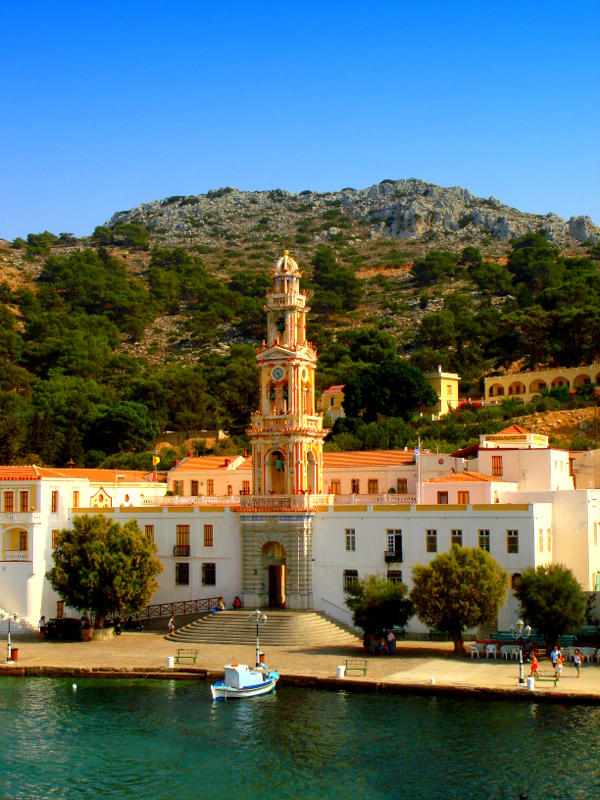
Taxiarchis Mihail Panormitis (Symi, Greece)

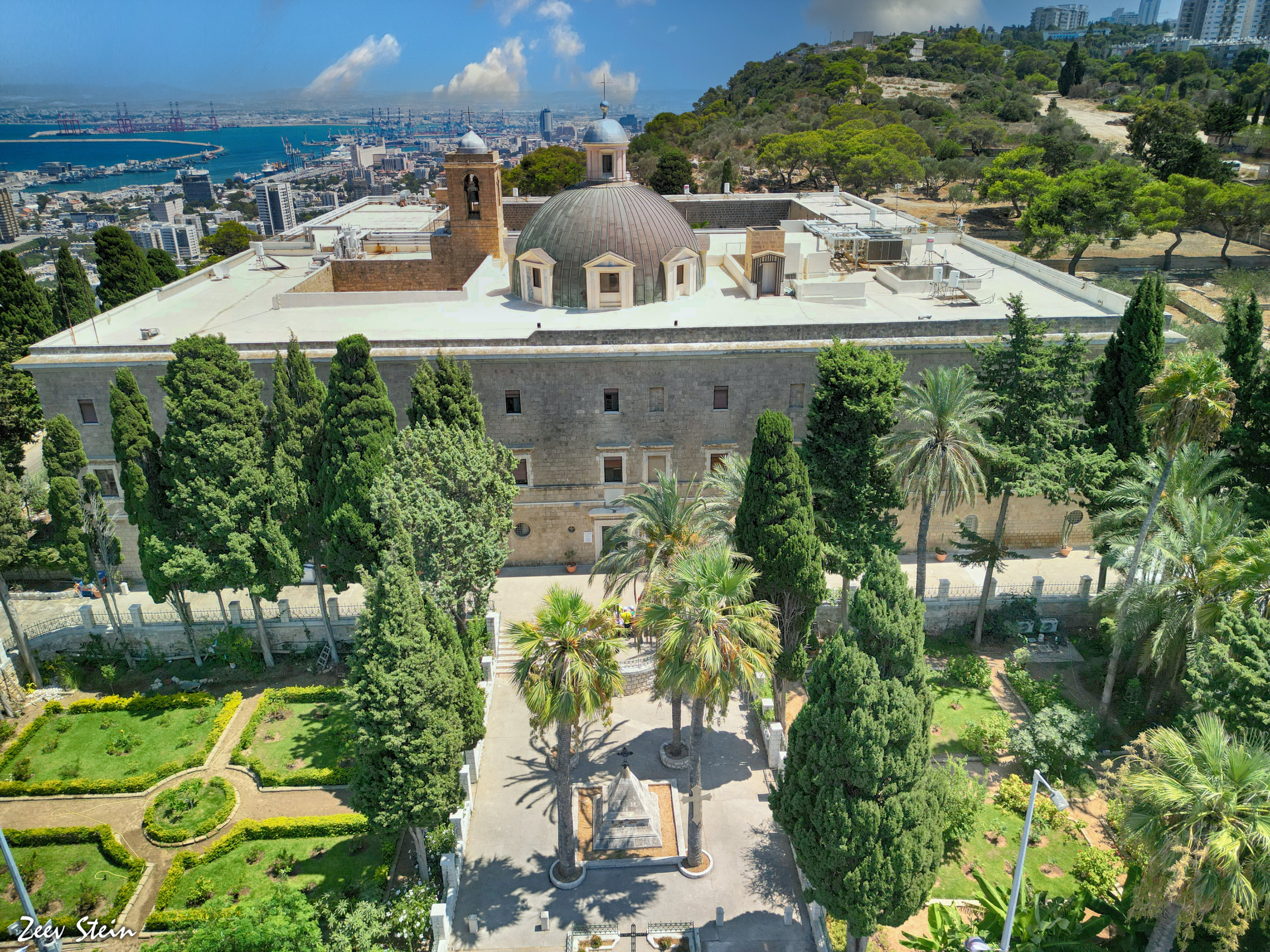
Stella Maris Monastery (Haifa, Israel)

== Mary & Michael Pilgrims' Way ==
The term St Michael's Line is also used to refer to a similar alignment of hilltop sites connecting significant Pre-Christian and Christian sites following a line across England that is drawn from two parallel (or interwined) lines – the purported Mary and Michael lines, recently promoted as a five week, 350 km pilgrimage walk (see map.) The route starts at St Michael's Mount on the southwest coast and travels east-by-northeast to St Mary's on the opposite coast; Cornwall to Norfolk. Sites along the way include the Boscawen-Un stone circle and the holy well at St Neot.

Sites linked to the archangel within southwest England, include St Michael's Mount, St Michael's Church (Brentor), Creech St Michael, Burrow Mump (also known as St Michael's Borough) and Glastonbury Tor.

This shorter alignment was first postulated in 1969 by John Mitchell and subsequently claimed to be supported by dowsing. As with other ley lines, no scientific evidence indicates that the alignment was planned and meaningful, making the claim pseudoscientific, but commonly reported at these sites.

== See also ==
- Saint Michael the Archangel
- Chaplet of Saint Michael
- Prayer to Saint Michael
