= Komen (disambiguation) =

Komen may refer to:

== Places ==
- Komen, a settlement in Slovenia
- Comines, Nord, (Dutch: Komen), a commune in France
- Comines-Warneton, (Dutch: Komen-Waasten), a Belgian city and municipality

== People with the surname Komen ==
- Daniel Komen (born 1976), Kenyan long-distance track runner and 1997 world champion
- Daniel Kipchirchir Komen (born 1984), Kenyan middle-distance runner
- Willy Komen (born 1987), Kenyan steeplechase runner

== Organizations ==
- Susan G. Komen for the Cure, breast cancer awareness organization
  - Susan G. Komen 3-Day for the Cure
