= Cyril Pavlov =

Russian priest (1919–2017)

Archimandrite Cyril (Russian: Архимандрит Кирилл, secular name Ivan Dmitrievich Pavlov, Russian: Иван Дмитриевич Павлов; 8 September 1919 – 20 February 2017) was a Russian Orthodox Christian monk, elder and Archimandrite, who was confessor to Patriarch Alexy II. He was also confessor to the previous patriarchs Alexy I and Pimen.

== Biography ==
Ivan Dmitrievich Pavlov was born September 8, 1919, in Makovskiye Vyselki, Ryazan Oblast, to a peasant family. After finishing at a polytechnical college, he worked as a technician at a metallurgic plant. Pavlov served in the military for six years, starting in the Soviet-Finnish War (1939–1940) and continuing through World War II, during which he fought in the Battle of Stalingrad (1942–1943). He was awarded the medal and title of "Hero of the Soviet Union" for his part in the defense of Stalingrad.

As a soldier, Pavlov reached Austria and participated in the battles at Lake Balaton. In 1946 he was demobilised in Hungary and came to Moscow.

=== Conversion ===
In one of the most bloody days lieutenant Pavlov found among the ruins the Gospel, opened, started reading and took it as a sign from above. He collected all the pages of the Gospel and never abandoned them. In one of the interviews he recollected, "When I started reading the Gospel – my eyes got opened upon everything surrounding me, upon all the events... I walked with the Gospel and was not afraid. Never. Such was the inspiration! Simply God was next to me and I was not afraid of anything...".

In 1946 Pavlov went to Yelokhovo Cathedral and, after asking for any theological institute, he was sent to the newly opened theological seminary at Novodevichy monastery. He arrived there in the military outfit and was gladly met by pro-rector Father Sergius. Thus the sergeant became the seminarian. Having finished the seminary, he studied at the Moscow Theological Academy and in 1953 took postrig becoming a monk, refusing the glory and awards. He completed the academy in 1954, by now not Ivan Dmitrievich Pavlov but hieromonk Cyril. Father Cyril lived at Trinity-Sergius lavra and became brotherly spiritual guide to the monks.

=== Later life and death ===
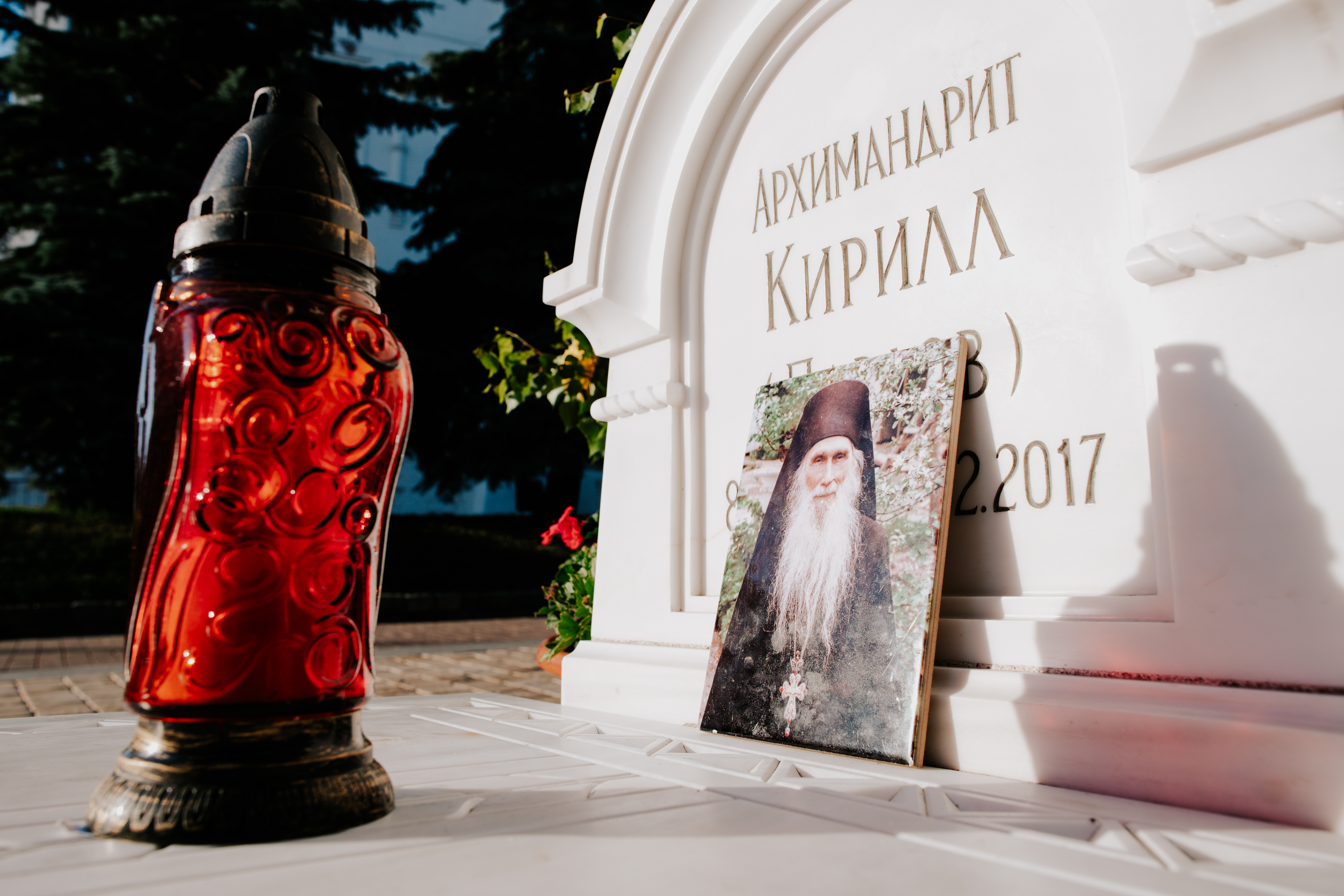

Until his death father Cyril lived in Peredelkino, in the residence of the Holy Patriarch of all Russia Aleksy II.

Archimandrite Cyril died on 20 February 2017 at the age of 97.
