= Giorgio Otranto =

Italian historian (1940–2023)

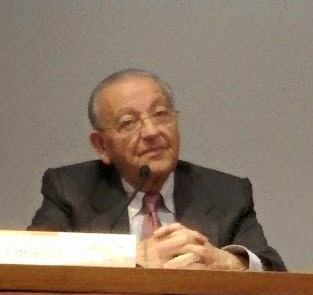
- Born: 19 September 1940; Corigliano Calabro, Cosenza, Italy
- Died: 5 January 2023 (aged 82); Bari, Italy
- Occupation: Historian

Giorgio Otranto (19 September 1940 – 5 January 2023) was an Italian historian, specialized in the history of early Christianity.

== Life and career ==
Born in Corigliano Calabro, the son of a tailor, Otranto graduated in Classical Literature at the University of Bari.

The main object of Otranto's studies was the history of Christianity, particularly the history of early Christianity in central and southern Italy up to the time of Pope Gregory I (590-604). He founded the Centro di studi Micaelici e Garganici in Monte Sant'Angelo, a research institute mainly devoted to studies related to the Archangel Michael cult. He served as a full professor of History of Christianity and Churches in the Faculty of Literature and Philosophy at his alma mater, and starting from the early 1990s he was visiting professor in a number of foreign universities. In 2012 he was awarded the Premio Presidente della Repubblica for his career.

Otranto died of a cerebral haemorrhage in Bari, on 5 January 2023, at the age of 82.
