= Michael (archangel) =

Angel in Abrahamic religions

Saint Michael the Archangel
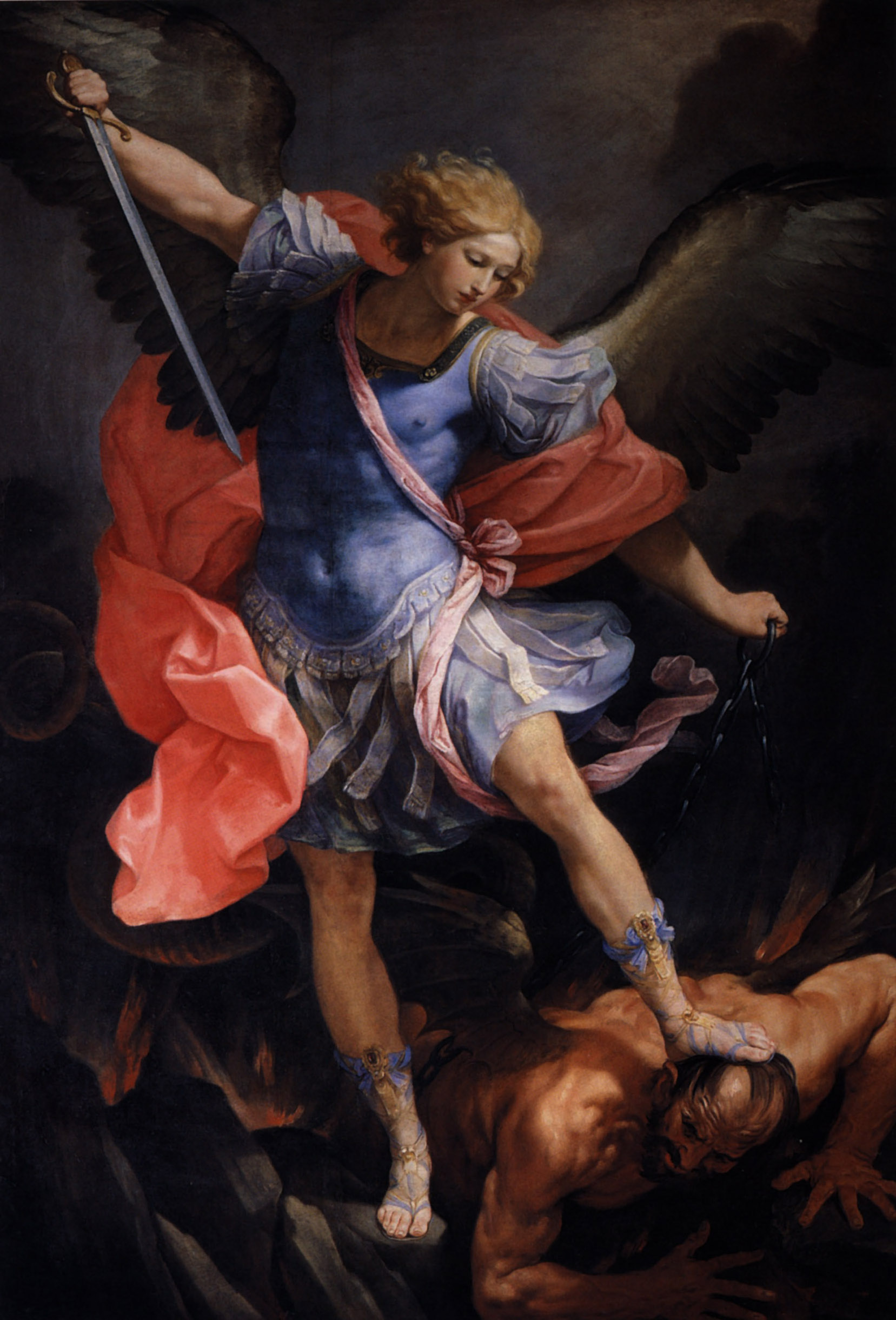
- Archangel Michael defeats Satan, painting by Guido Reni (between 1630–1635)

Archangel Prince (Commander) of the Heavenly Host Guardian of the Church
- Venerated in: Judaism; All Christian denominations which venerate saints; Islam; Bahá'í Faith
- Major shrine: Mont Saint-Michel, Sanctuary of Saint Michael the Archangel
- Feast: 29 September ("Michaelmas" – Catholic Church, Anglican Communion and Lutheranism); October 15 & 6th Sunday of Lent (Assyrian Church of the East); 8 November (New Calendar Eastern Orthodox Churches); 8 November (Eastern Catholic Churches); 21 November (Old Calendar Eastern Orthodox Churches); 12th of each month in Coptic calendar (Coptic Churches); Many other local and historical feasts
- Attributes: banner, scales, weighing souls, sword, slaying Satan or a dragon
- Patronage: Guardian of the Catholic Church, Vatican City, Rome, Lazio, Italy,, Germany, Israel Normandy, France, Kyiv, Ukraine, Laoang, Basey, dying people, poor souls, bankers, grocers, police, military.

Michael, (Note: (Hebrew: [mixaˈʔel]; Hebrew: מִיכָאֵל, romanized: Mīḵāʾēl, lit. 'Who is like El [God]?'; Ancient Greek: Μιχαήλ, romanized: Mikhaḗl; Latin: Michahel; Arabic: ميخائيل ، مِيكَالَ ، ميكائيل, romanized: Mīkāʾīl, Mīkāl, Mīkhāʾīl)) also called Archangel Michael, Michael the Taxiarch, or Saint Michael the Archangel is an archangel and the warrior of God in Judaism, Christianity, and Islam while additionally being venerated as a saint in some Christian traditions. The earliest surviving mentions of his name are in third- and second-century BC Jewish works, often but not always apocalyptic, where he is the chief of the angels and archangels, and he is the guardian prince of ancient Israel and is responsible for the care of the Israelites. Christianity conserved nearly all the Jewish traditions concerning him, and he is mentioned explicitly in Revelation 12:7–12, where he battles with Satan, and in the Epistle of Jude, where the archangel and the devil dispute over the body of Moses.

== Old Testament and Deuterocanon ==
The Book of Enoch lists Michael as one of seven archangels (the remaining names are Uriel, Raguel, Raphael, Sariel, Gabriel, and Remiel), who in the Book of Tobit "stand ready and enter before the glory of the Lord". The fact that Michael is introduced implies the knowledge of him and the other named angels. He is mentioned again in the last chapters of the Book of Daniel, a Jewish apocalypse composed in the second century BC, in which a man clothed in linen (never identified, but matching a description given to John in Revelation regarding the Alpha and Omega) tells Daniel that he and "Michael, your prince" are engaged in a battle with the "prince of Persia", after which, at the end-time, "Michael, the great prince who protects your people, will arise".

Enoch was instrumental in establishing the pre-eminent place of Michael among the angels and archangels, and in later Jewish works, he is said to be their chief, mediating the Torah (the Law of God), and standing at the right hand of the throne of God. In the traditions of the Qumran community, he defends or leads the people of God in the eschatological (i.e., end-time) battle. In other writings, he is responsible for the care of Israel and acts as commander of the heavenly armies; he is Israel's advocate contesting Satan's claim to the body of Moses; he intercedes between God and humanity and serves as High Priest in the heavenly sanctuary; and he accompanies the souls of the righteous dead to Paradise.

== New Testament ==
The seven archangels (or four, as traditions differ but always include Michael) were associated with the branches of the menorah, the sacred seven-branched lampstand in the Temple as the seven spirits before the throne of God, and this is reflected in the Book of Revelation 4:5 ("Coming from the throne are flashes of lightning and rumblings and peals of thunder, and in front of the throne burn seven flaming torches, which are the seven spirits of God," – NRSVue). Michael is mentioned explicitly in Revelation 12:7–12, where he does battle with Satan and casts him out of heaven so that he no longer has access to God as accuser (his formal role in the Old Testament). The fall of Satan at the coming of Jesus marks the separation of the New Testament from Judaism. In Luke 22:31, Jesus tells Peter that Satan has asked God for permission to "sift" the disciples, the goal being to accuse them, but the accusation is opposed by Jesus, who thus takes on the role played by angels, and especially by Michael, in Judaism.

Michael is mentioned by name for the second time in the Epistle of Jude, which is an impassioned plea for the believers to engage in battle against the incursion of the error. In verses 9–10, the author denounces the heretics by contrasting them with the archangel Michael, who, in disputing with Satan over the body of Moses, "did not presume to pronounce the verdict of 'slander' but said, 'The Lᴏʀᴅ rebuke you!'"

== Judaism ==
The name Michael in Hebrew

According to rabbinic tradition, Michael acted as the advocate of Israel, and sometimes had to fight with the princes of the other nations (Daniel 10:13) and particularly with the angel Samael, Israel's accuser. Their enmity dates from the time Samael was thrown from heaven and tried to drag Michael down with him, necessitating God's intervention.

The idea that Michael was the advocate of the Jews became so prevalent that in spite of the rabbinical prohibition against appealing to angels as intermediaries between God and his people, he held a place in the Jewish liturgy: "When a man is in need he must pray directly to God, and neither to Michael nor to Gabriel." Jeremiah addresses a prayer to him.

The rabbis declare that Michael entered into his role of defender at the time of the biblical patriarchs. Rabbi Eliezer ben Jacob said he rescued Abraham from the furnace into which he had been thrown by Nimrod (Midrash Genesis Rabbah xliv. 16). Some say he was the "one that had escaped" (Genesis 14:13), who told Abraham that Lot had been taken captive (Midrash Pirke R. El.), and who protected Sarah from defilement by Abimelech.

Michael prevented Isaac from sacrifice by his father by substituting a ram in his place. He saved Jacob, while yet in his mother's womb, from death by Samael. He later prevented Laban from harming Jacob.(Pirke De-Rabbi Eliezer, xxxvi).

The midrash Exodus Rabbah holds that Michael exercised his function of advocate of Israel at the time of the Exodus and destroyed Sennacherib's army.

== Gnosticism ==
In the Secret Book of John, a second-century text found in the Nag Hammadi codices of Gnosticism, Michael is placed in control of the demons who help Yaldabaoth create Adam, along with six others named Uriel, Asmenedas, Saphasatoel, Aarmouriam, Richram, and Amiorps. According to Origen of Alexandria in his work Against Celsus, Michael was represented as a lion on the Ophite Diagram.

== Christianity ==
=== Early Christian views and devotions ===
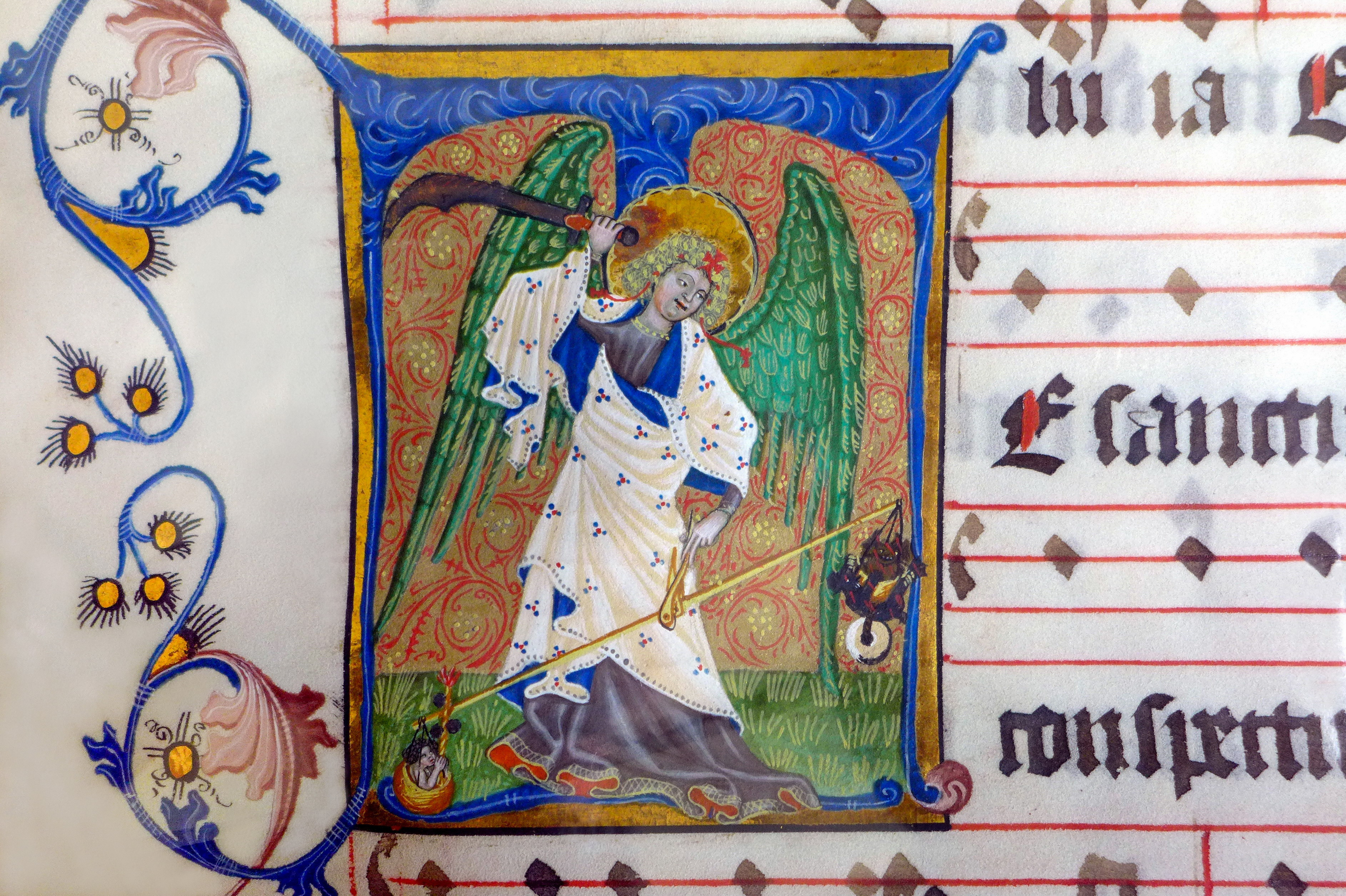
St. Michael weighing souls during the Last Judgement, Antiphonale Cisterciense (15th century), Abbey Bibliotheca, Rein Abbey, Austria

From the second-century onward, evidence exists attesting early Christian identifications of Michael as identical with the Christ particularly in works concerned with or by non-proto-orthodox groups such Pseudo-Cyprian's De Centesima, Epiphanius's description of the Ebionites and the sect of the Elcasaites, Tertullian's attack on Valentinian Christology, and certain magical texts, especially the Testament of Solomon. The Shepherd of Hermas, possibly Oxyrhynchus Papyrus 1152, the Gospel of the Hebrews, the pseudo-Clementine writings, and Epiphanius's Panarion (Note: Panarion XXX. 16.2–4) appear to share this view. Other second- and third-century texts show that identifying Christ with an angel was not uncommon at the time—these include the Gospel of Thomas, the Gospel of Nicodemus, the Testament of Dan, and the Epistle to Diognetus. These beliefs likely derived from similar pre-Christian Jewish beliefs, such as those found in the Prayer of Joseph and the beliefs of the Magarites.

Epiphanius of Salamis (c. 310 – c. 320 – 403) in his Coptic-Arabic Hexaemeron additionally referred to Michael as a replacement of Satan. Accordingly, after Satan fell, Michael was appointed to the function Satan served when he was still one of the noble angels.

Byzantine tradition attributed two Bosporus-shore sanctuaries of the Archangel Michael to Constantine. The first at Hestia/Anaplous—plausibly in the area of modern Arnavutköy, about 35 stadia by sea and over 70 by land from Constantinople. The second at Sosthenion, commonly identified with modern İstinye. Sozomen is the earliest witness for the Hestia site, while John Malalas places a Michaelion at Sosthenion and embeds it in a foundation legend that repurposes a pre-existing pagan shrine tied to the Argonauts. Later sources often use "Anaplous" for the wider western Bosporus shore, which helps explain why Hestia/Anaplous and Sosthenion are sometimes conflated in the literature. He was syncretically identified with the attributes of the god Attis in Phrygia and thus associated with pre-Christian healing springs in Phrygia, his main cult site was in Chonae.

A painting of the Archangel slaying a serpent became a major art piece at the Michaelion after Constantine defeated Licinius near there in 324. This contributed to the standard iconography that developed of the Archangel Michael as a warrior saint slaying a dragon. The Michaelion was a magnificent church and in time became a model for hundreds of other churches in Eastern Christianity; these spread devotions to the Archangel.

In the fourth century, Saint Basil the Great's homily (De Angelis) placed Saint Michael over all the angels. He was called "Archangel" because he heralds other angels, the title Ἀρχαγγέλος (archangelos) applied to him in Jude 1:9. Into the sixth century, the view of Michael as a healer continued in Rome; after a plague, the sick slept at night in the church of Castel Sant'Angelo (dedicated to him for saving Rome), waiting for his manifestation.

In the sixth century, the growth of devotions to Michael in the Western Church was expressed by the feasts dedicated to him, as recorded in the Leonine Sacramentary. The seventh-century Gelasian Sacramentary included the feast "S. Michaelis Archangeli", as did the eighth-century Gregorian Sacramentary. Some of these documents refer to a Basilica Archangeli (no longer extant) on via Salaria in Rome.

The angelology of Pseudo-Dionysius, which was widely read as of the sixth century, gave Michael a rank in the hierarchy of angels. Later, in the thirteenth century, others such as Bonaventure believed him to be Prince of the Seraphim, the first of the nine angelic orders. According to Thomas Aquinas (Summa Ia. 113.3), he is Prince of the last and lowest choir, the Angels.

=== Catholicism ===
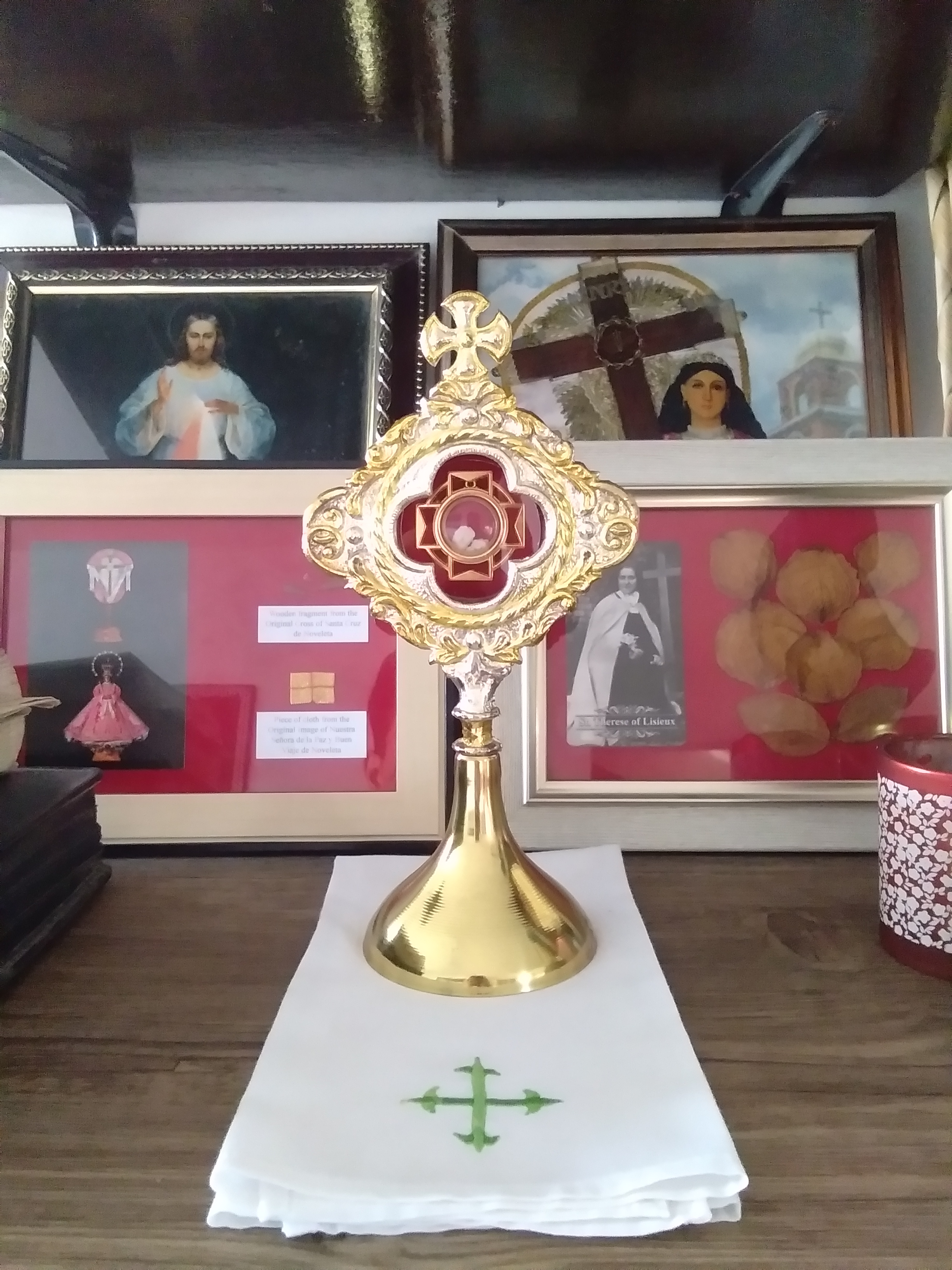
Second-class relic stone of Saint Michael the Archangel from Monte Gargano, Italy

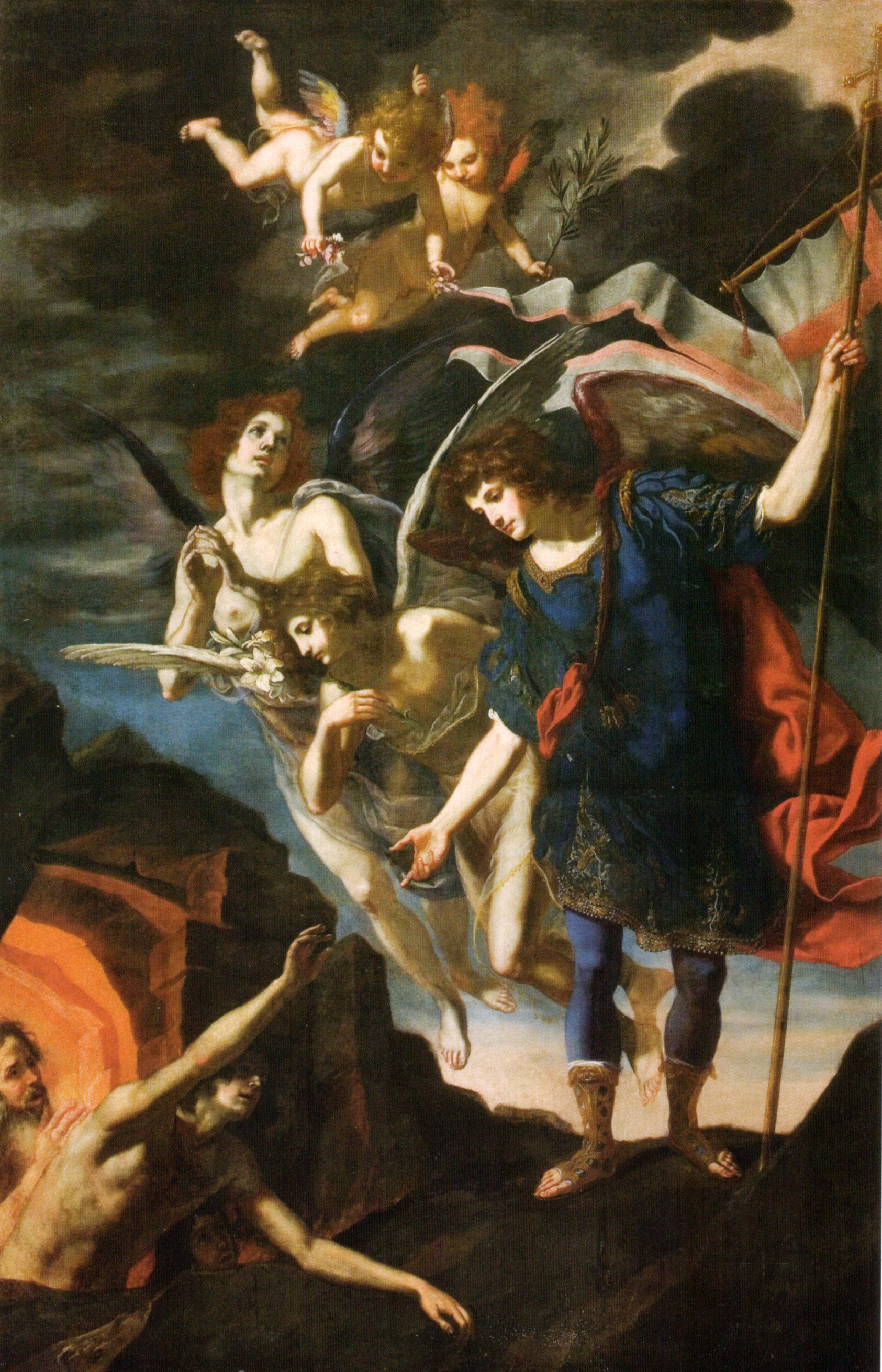
Archangel Michael frees souls from purgatory, by Jacopo Vignali, 17th century

Catholics often refer to Michael as "Holy Michael, the Archangel" or "Saint Michael". He is generally referred to in Christian litanies as "Saint Michael", as in the Litany of the Saints. In the shortened version said at the Easter Vigil, he alone of the angels and archangels is mentioned by name, omitting Saints Gabriel and Raphael.

In Roman Catholic teachings, Saint Michael has four main roles or offices. His first role is the leader of the Army of God and the leader of celestial forces in triumphing over the powers of Hell. He is viewed as the angelic model for the virtues of the "spiritual warrior", his conflict with evil taken as "the battle within".

The second and third roles of Michael in Catholic teachings deal with death. In his second role, he is the angel of death, carrying the souls of Christians to Heaven. Catholic prayers often refer to this role of Michael. In his third role, he weighs souls on his perfectly balanced scales, a common object he holds in art.

In his fourth role, Saint Michael, the special patron of the Chosen People in the Old Testament, is also Guardian of the Church. Saint Michael was revered by the military orders of knights during the Middle Ages. Moreover, doubtless for the same motive he was considered the patron saint of a number of cities and countries.

Catholic tradition includes the Prayer to Saint Michael, which specifically asks the saint to "defend" the faithful from evil. The Chaplet of Saint Michael consists of nine salutations, one for each choir of angels.

==== Saint Michael the Archangel prayer ====
Sancte Míchael Archángele,
defénde nos in próelio;
contra nequítiam et insídias diáboli esto praesídium.
Imperet illi Deus, súpplices deprecámur,
tuque, Prínceps milítiae caeléstis,
Sátanam aliósque spíritus malígnos,
qui ad perditiónem animárum pervagántur in mundo,
divína virtúte, in inférnum detrúde.

Translation:

Saint Michael the Archangel,
defend us in battle.
Be our protection against the wickedness and snares of the Devil.
May God rebuke him, we humbly pray,
and do thou, O Prince of the heavenly hosts,
by the power of God, thrust into hell Satan,
and all the evil spirits, who prowl about the world
seeking the ruin of souls.

=== Eastern and Oriental Orthodoxy ===
The Eastern Orthodox accord Michael the title Archistrategos, or "Supreme Commander of the Heavenly Hosts". The Eastern Orthodox pray to their guardian angels and above all, to Michael and Gabriel.

The Eastern Orthodox have always had strong devotions to angels. In contemporary times, they are referred to by the term of "Bodiless Powers". A number of feasts dedicated to Archangel Michael are celebrated by the Eastern Orthodox throughout the year.

Archangel Michael is mentioned in a number of Eastern Orthodox hymns and prayer, and his icons are widely used within Eastern Orthodox churches. In many Eastern Orthodox icons, Christ is accompanied by a number of angels, Michael being a predominant figure among them.

In Russia, many monasteries, cathedrals, court and merchant churches are dedicated to the Chief Commander Michael; most Russian cities have a church or chapel dedicated to the Archangel Michael.

In Ukraine, the Archangel Michael is the patron saint of the capital city, Kyiv. He became popular since the time of Prince Vsevolod of Kievan Rus'.

While in the Serbian Orthodox Church Saint Sava has a special role as the establisher of its autocephaly and the largest Belgrade church is devoted to him, the capital Belgrade's Orthodox cathedral, the see church of the patriarch, is devoted to Archangel Michael (in Serbian: Арханђел Михаило / Arhanđel Mihailo).

The place of Michael in the Coptic Orthodox Church of Alexandria is as a saintly intercessor. He is the one who presents to God the prayers of the just, who accompanies the souls of the dead to heaven, who defeats the devil. He is celebrated liturgically on the 12th of each Coptic month. In Alexandria, a church was dedicated to him in the early fourth century on the 12th of the month of Paoni. The 12th of the month of Hathor is the celebration of Michael's appointment in heaven, where Michael became the chief of the angels.

=== Protestantism ===
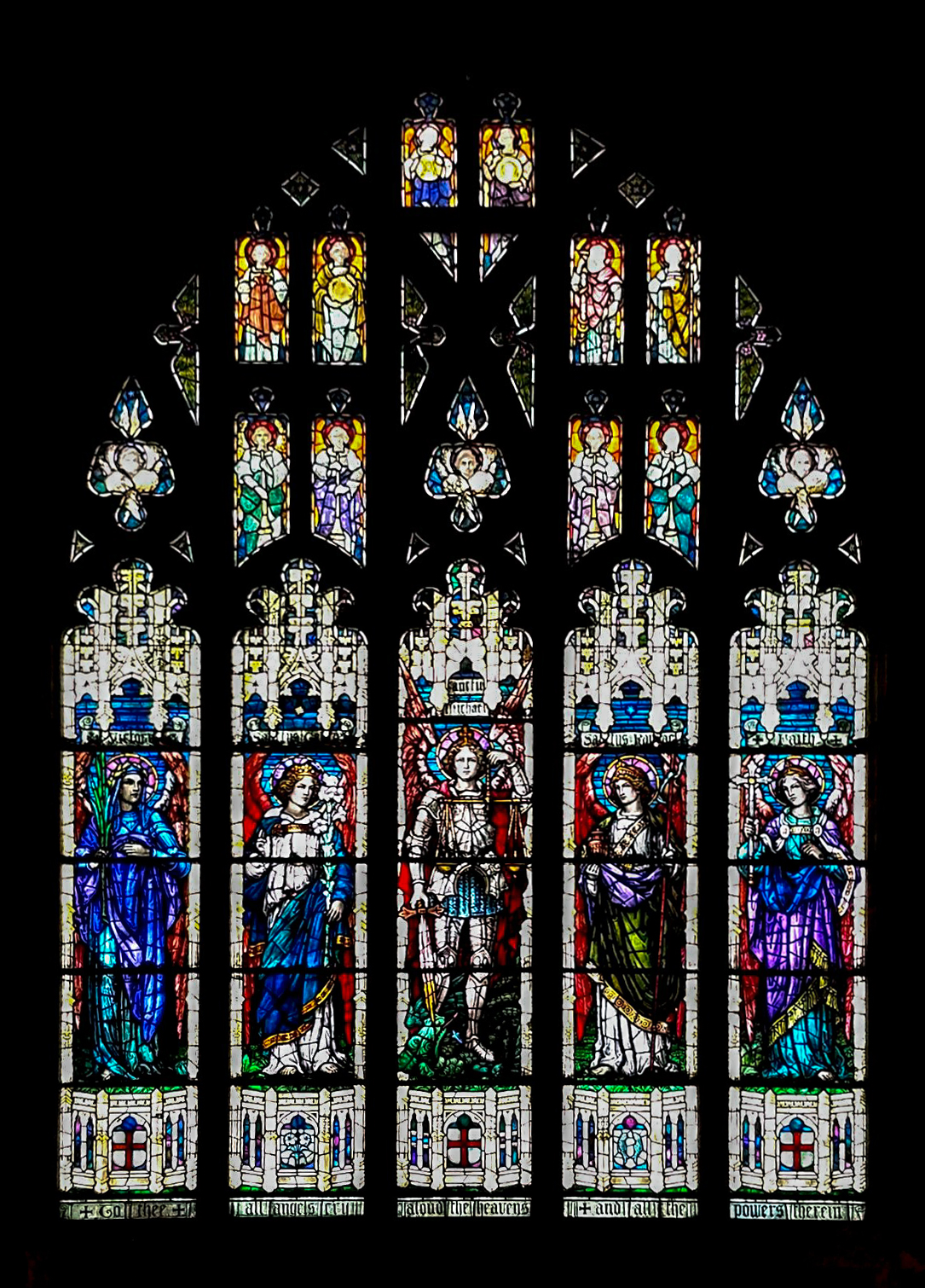
West window showing Michael in armour, Episcopal Church of the Good Shepherd (Rosemont, Pennsylvania) United States; memorial to the dead of the First World War

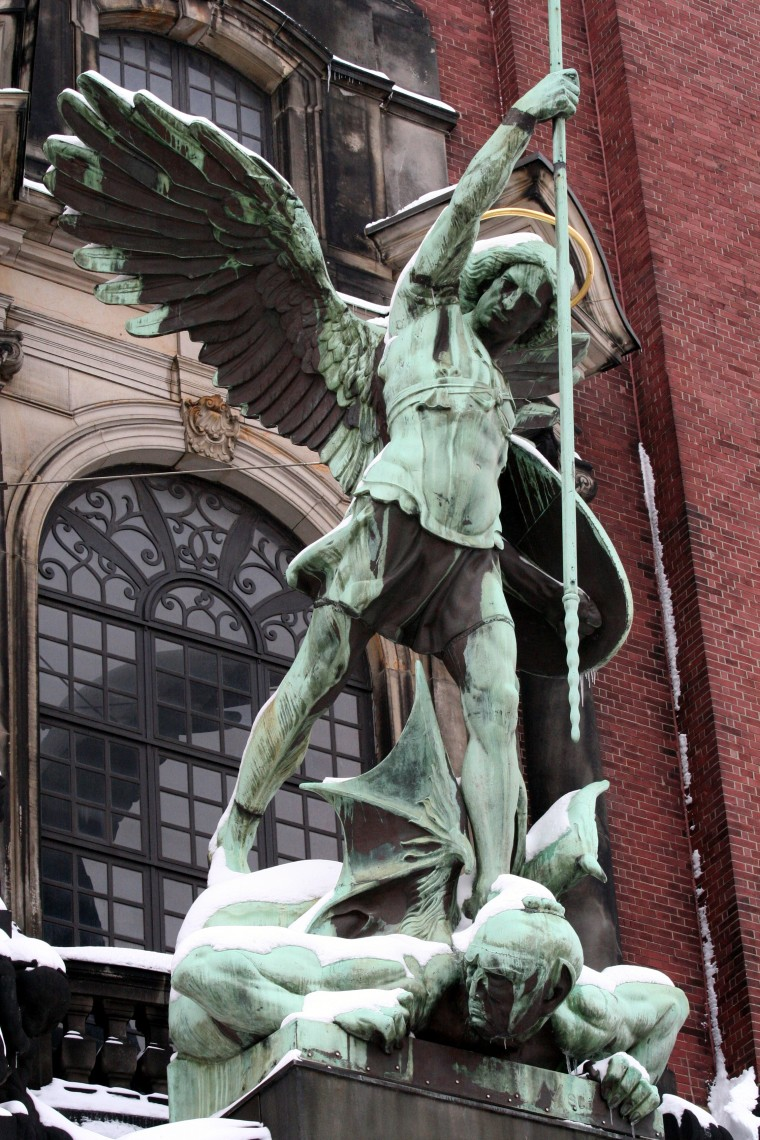
Statue at St. Michael's Church, Hamburg

Protestants recognize Michael as an archangel. The Anglican and Methodist traditions recognize four archangels: Michael, Raphael, Gabriel, and Uriel. The controversial Anglican bishop Robert Clayton (d. 1758) proposed that Michael was the Logos and Gabriel the Holy Spirit. Controversy over Clayton's views led the government to order his prosecution, but he died before his scheduled examination.

The Lutheran Churches of St. Michael's Church, Hamburg and St. Michael's Church, Hildesheim are named for Michael. In Bach's time, the annual feast of Michael and All the Angels on 29 September was regularly celebrated with a festive service in Lutheran churches, for which Bach composed several cantatas, for example the chorale cantata Herr Gott, dich loben alle wir, BWV 130 in 1724, Es erhub sich ein Streit, BWV 19, in 1726 and Man singet mit Freuden vom Sieg, BWV 149, in 1728 or 1729.

Like the aforementioned early Christian groups, many Protestant theologians identify a relationship, (e.g. typological or identical), between Michael and Christ in some (Note: At times (particularly in the Lutheran tradition) positing that both a created angel named "Michael" and "Michael" a title born by Christ coexist.) or all Biblical mentions of the name including:

Martin Luther Ernst Wilhelm Hengstenberg, Andrew Willet Herman Witsius W. L. Alexander, Jacobus Ode, Campegius Vitringa, Philip Melanchthon, Hugh Broughton, Franciscus Junius, Hävernick Amandus Polanus, Johannes Oecolampadius, Samuel Horsely, William Kincaid John Calvin Isaac Watts, John Brown, and James Wood.

However, Charles Spurgeon once stated that Jesus is "the true Michael" and "the only Archangel" and John Gill comments on Jude 9, "'Yet Michael the archangel ...' By whom is meant, not a created angel, but an eternal one, the Lord Jesus Christ ..."

==== Seventh-day Adventists ====
Many scholars belonging to the Seventh-day Adventists believe that "Michael" is but one of the many titles applied to the pre-existent Christ, or Son of God. According to Adventists, such a view does not in any way conflict with the belief in the full deity and eternal preexistence of Jesus Christ, nor does it in the least disparage his person and work. According to Adventist theology, Michael was considered the "eternal Word", and the one by whom all things were created. The Word was then born incarnate as Jesus.

They believe that name "Michael" signifies "One Who Is Like God" and that as the "Archangel" or "chief or head of the angels" he led the angels and thus the statement in Revelation 12:7–9 identifies/refers to Jesus as Michael.

=== Restorationism ===
==== Jehovah's Witnesses ====
Jehovah's Witnesses believe Michael to be another name for Jesus in heaven, in his pre-human and post-resurrection existence. They say the definite article at Jude 9—referring to "Michael the archangel"—identifies Michael as the only archangel. They consider Michael to be synonymous with Christ, described at 1 Thessalonians 4:16 as descending "with a cry of command, with the voice of an archangel, and with the sound of the trumpet".

They believe the prominent roles assigned to Michael at Daniel 12:1, Revelation 12:7, Revelation 19:14, and Revelation 16 are identical to Jesus' roles, being the one chosen to lead God's people and as the only one who "stands up", identifying the two as the same spirit being. Because they identify Michael with Jesus, he is therefore considered the first and greatest of all God's heavenly sons, God's chief messenger, who takes the lead in vindicating God's sovereignty, sanctifying his name, fighting the wicked forces of Satan and protecting God's covenant people on earth. Jehovah's Witnesses also identify Michael with the "Angel of the Lord" who led and protected the Israelites in the wilderness. Their earliest teachings stated that Archangel Michael was not to be worshipped.

==== The Church of Jesus Christ of Latter-day Saints ====
Members of the Church of Jesus Christ of Latter-day Saints believe that Michael is Adam, the Ancient of Days (Dan. 7), a prince, and the patriarch of the human family. They also hold that Michael assisted Jehovah (the pre-mortal form of Jesus) in the creation of the world under the direction of God the Father (Elohim); under the direction of the Father, Michael also cast Satan out of heaven.

== Islam ==
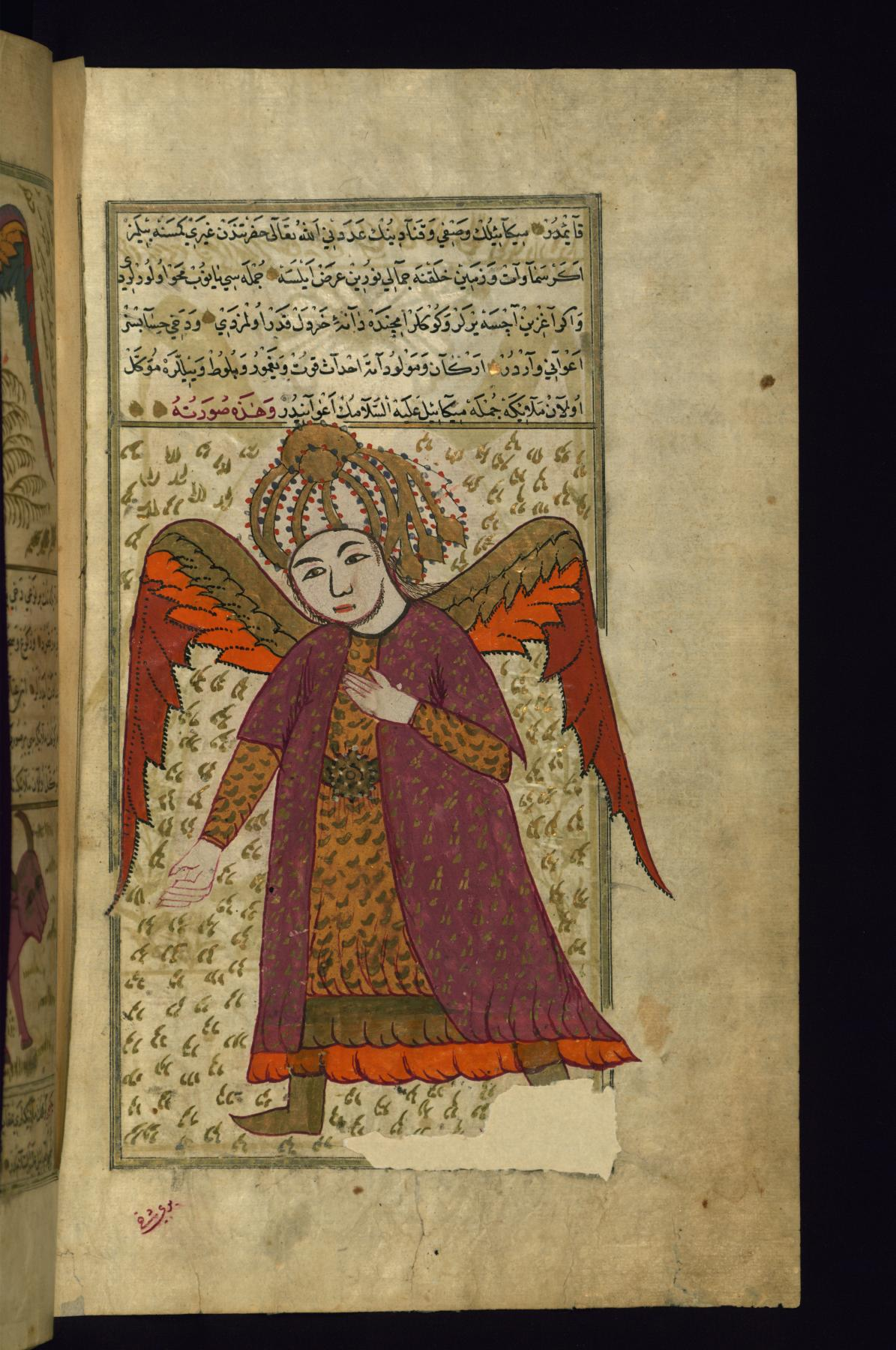
Muhammad ibn Muhammad Shakir Ruzmah-'i Nathani – The Archangel Michael – Walters W65946B

In Islam, Michael, or Mīkāʾīl, is one of the four archangels along with Jibril (Gabriel, with whom he is often paired), ʾIsrāfīl (trumpeter angel) and ʿAzrāʾīl (angel of death). He is mentioned only once in the Quran, along with Gabriel in Quran 2:98. The verse is understood as a rejection of the claim of the Jews of Medina stating that Gabriel is the enemy of Michael. In hadith and tafsir, the meaning of the term is occasionally interpreted as "ʿabd Allāh" (Servant of God).

In further Islamic literature, Michael is associated with mercy. He asks God for forgiveness for humans and is one of the first angels who obeyed God's orders to bow before Adam. From the tears of Michael, angels of mercy are created as his helpers. Like Gabriel, with whom he is often mentioned together, Michael is also a messenger. While Gabriel delivers messages from heaven to humans, Michael delivers messages to the angelic world. As the angel to effectuate God's providence he is also associated with natural phenomena and causes rain upon the lands. The latter function is also attested among modern writers, such as Sayyid Qutb. Unlike Christian tradition, Michael is rarely portrayed as a warrior-angel, with a few references to the Battle of Badr by Suyuti as an exception.

The Miraj literature occasionally mentions both Gabriel and Michael as two angels who showed Muhammad Paradise and Hell. However, he does not feature prominently and some accounts do not mention him at all. Prayers concerning Michael appear in some devotional literature, but usually in conjunction with the other three archangels. He is mentioned in a Shia supplication (dua), reportedly handed down by the sixth Imam Ja'far al-Sadiq, in the prayers for blessings for the Bearers of the Throne.

== Bahá'í Faith ==
The archangel Michael seems to have never been mentioned publicly by Baha'u'llah, 'Abdu'l-Baha, Shoghi Effendi, or even the Universal House of Justice. Bahá'í publications interpreting the Book of Revelation from the New Testament say Baha'u'llah was a chief prince of Persia foretold as Michael who would win "final victory over the dragon". Or, Michael, "One like God", is thought to be Baha'u'llah, as archangel Michael is thought to be an emanation of Hod or "glory" in Jewish Mysticism – because "Baha'u'llah" means splendor or glory of God.

== Feasts ==
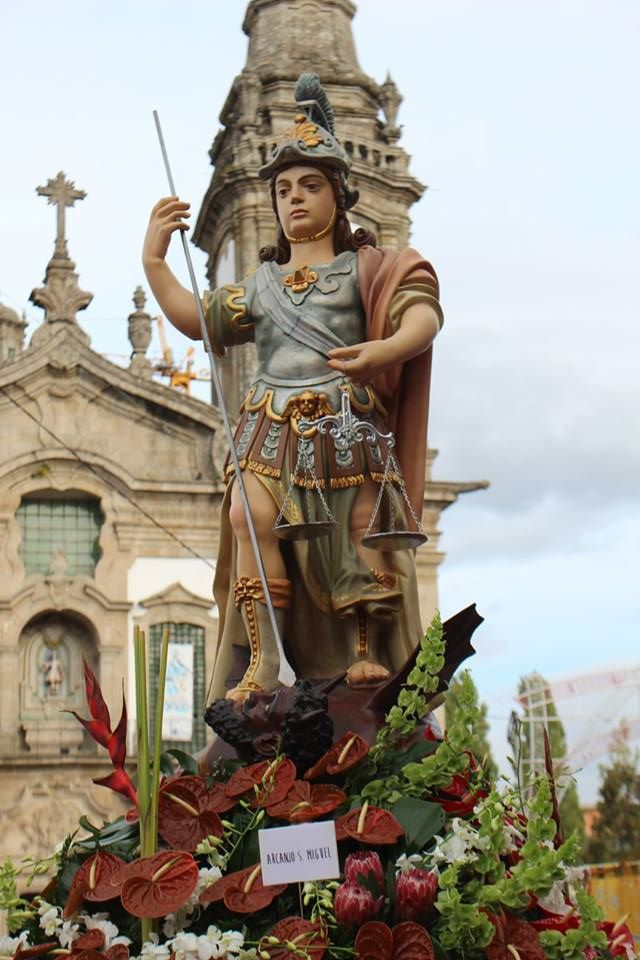
Archangel Michael at a Portuguese feast in Cabeceiras de Basto

In the General Roman Calendar, the Anglican Calendar of Saints, and the Lutheran Calendar of Saints, the archangel's feast is celebrated on Michaelmas Day, 29 September. The day is also considered the feast of Saints Michael, Gabriel, and Raphael, in the General Roman Calendar and the Feast of Saint Michael and All Angels according to the Church of England.

In the Eastern Orthodox Church, Saint Michael's principal feast day is 8 November (those that use the Julian calendar celebrate it on what in the Gregorian calendar is now 21 November), honouring him along with the rest of the "Bodiless Powers of Heaven" (i.e. angels) as their Supreme Commander (Synaxis of the Archangel Michael and the Other Bodiless Powers), and the Miracle at Chonae is commemorated on 6 September.

In the calendar of the Church of England diocese of Truro, 8 May is the feast of St. Michael, Protector of Cornwall. The archangel Michael is one of the three patron saints of Cornwall. The feast of the Appearing of S. Michael the Archangel is observed by Anglo-Catholics on 8 May. From medieval times until 1960 it was also observed on that day in the Roman Catholic Church; the feast commemorates the archangel's apparition on Mount Gargano in Italy.

In the Coptic Orthodox Church, the main feast day in 12 Hathor and 12 Paoni, and he is celebrated liturgically on the 12th of each Coptic month.

Feast of Saint Michael and All Angels is commemorated on 29 September in ROCOR Western Rite.

Apparition of Saint Michael in 492 on Mount Gargano is commemorated on 8 May and Dedication of Saint Michael the Archangel is commemorated on 29 September (Antiochian Western Rite Vicariate).

Dedication of Saint Michael sanctuary Mont Saint-Michel by Saint Aubert of Avranches is commemorated on 16 October.

On 7 April, the Oriental Orthodox Churches commemorates the deliverance of prophet Jeremiah from prison by Michael.

== Patronages and orders ==
In late medieval Christianity, Michael, together with Saint George, became the patron saint of chivalry and is now also considered the patron saint of police officers, paramedics and the military.

Since the victorious Battle of Lechfeld against the Hungarians in 955, Michael was the patron saint of the Holy Roman Empire and the Patron of the Germans.

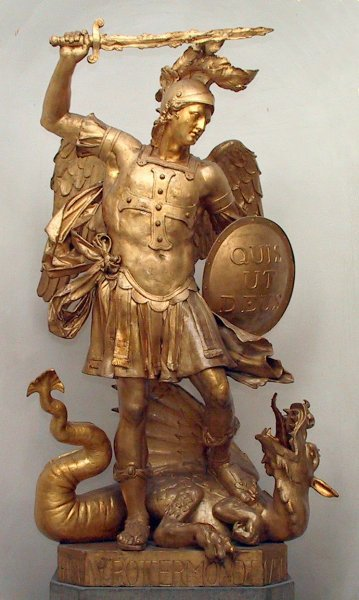
Statue of St Michael at the former seat of the Bavarian Military Order of Saint Michael in the Electoral Palace, Bonn, Germany

In mid- to late fifteenth century, France was one of only four courts in Western Christendom without an order of knighthood. Later in the fifteenth century, Jean Molinet glorified the primordial feat of arms of the archangel as "the first deed of knighthood and chivalrous prowess that was ever achieved." Thus Michael was the natural patron of the first chivalric order of France, the Order of Saint Michael of 1469. In the British honours system, a chivalric order founded in 1818 is also named for these two saints, the Order of St Michael and St George (see also: Order of Saint Michael).

Prior to 1878, the Scapular of St. Michael the Archangel could be worn as part of a Roman Catholic Archconfraternity. Presently, enrollment is authorized as this holy scapular remains as one of the 18 approved by the Church.

Apart from his being a patron of warriors, the sick and the suffering also consider Archangel Michael their patron saint. Based on the legend of his eighth-century apparition at Mont Saint-Michel, France, the Archangel is the patron of mariners in this famous sanctuary. After the evangelisation of Germany, where mountains were often dedicated to pagan gods, Christians placed many mountains under the patronage of the Archangel, and numerous mountain chapels of St. Michael appeared all over Germany.

Similarly, the Sanctuary of St. Michel (San Migel Aralarkoa), the oldest Christian building in Navarre (Spain), lies at the top of a hill on the Aralar Range, and harbours Carolingian remains. St. Michel is an ancient devotion of Navarre and eastern Gipuzkoa, revered by the Basques, shrouded in legend, and held as a champion against paganism and heresy. It came to symbolize the defense of Catholicism, as well as Basque tradition and values during the early twentieth century.

Coat of arms of Brussels

Coat of arms of Kyiv

He has been the patron saint of Brussels since the Middle Ages. The city of Arkhangelsk in Russia is named for the Archangel. Ukraine and its capital Kyiv also consider Michael their patron saint and protector.

In Linlithgow, Scotland, St. Michael has been the patron saint of the town since the thirteenth century, with St. Michael's Parish Church being originally constructed in 1134. Since the fourteenth century, Saint Michael has been the patron saint of Dumfries in Scotland, where a church dedicated to him was built at the southern end of the town, on a mound overlooking the River Nith.

An Anglican sisterhood dedicated to Saint Michael under the title of the Community of St Michael and All Angels was founded in 1851. The Congregation of Saint Michael the Archangel (CSMA), also known as the Michaelite Fathers, is a religious order of the Roman Catholic Church founded in 1897. The Canons Regular of the Order of St Michael the Archangel (OSM) are an Order of professed religious within the Anglican Church in North America, the North American component of the Anglican realignment movement.

The city of Arkhangelsk, Russia, and the federal subject Arkhangelsk Oblast are named after Michael the Archangel.

In the United States military, Saint Michael is considered to be a patron of paratroopers and, in particular, the 82nd Airborne Division. One of the first battles where the unit first was combat christened is the Battle of Saint-Mihiel during World War I.

The beret insignia of the French paratroopers is a winged arm grasping a dagger, representing Saint Michael. Saint Michael is the patronus of 9th Paratroopers Assault Regiment "Col Moschin" and the Polizia di Stato. Saint Michael (Croatian: Sveti Mihovil) is patron of Croatian Police and Croatian Army, his feast day being also celebrated as the Police day in Croatia.

== Legends ==
=== Judaism ===
There is a legend which seems to be of Jewish origin, and which was adopted by the Copts, to the effect that Michael was first sent by God to bring Nebuchadnezzar (c. 600 BC) against Jerusalem, and that Michael was afterward very active in freeing his nation from Babylonian captivity. According to midrash Genesis Rabbah, Michael saved Hananiah and his companions from the fiery furnace. Michael was active in the time of Esther: "The more Haman accused Israel on earth, the more Michael defended Israel in heaven". It was Michael who reminded Ahasuerus that he was Mordecai's debtor; and there is a legend that Michael appeared to the high priest Hyrcanus, promising him assistance.

According to Legends of the Jews, archangel Michael was the chief of a band of angels who questioned God's decision to create man on Earth. The entire band of angels, except for Michael, was then consumed by fire.

=== Christianity ===
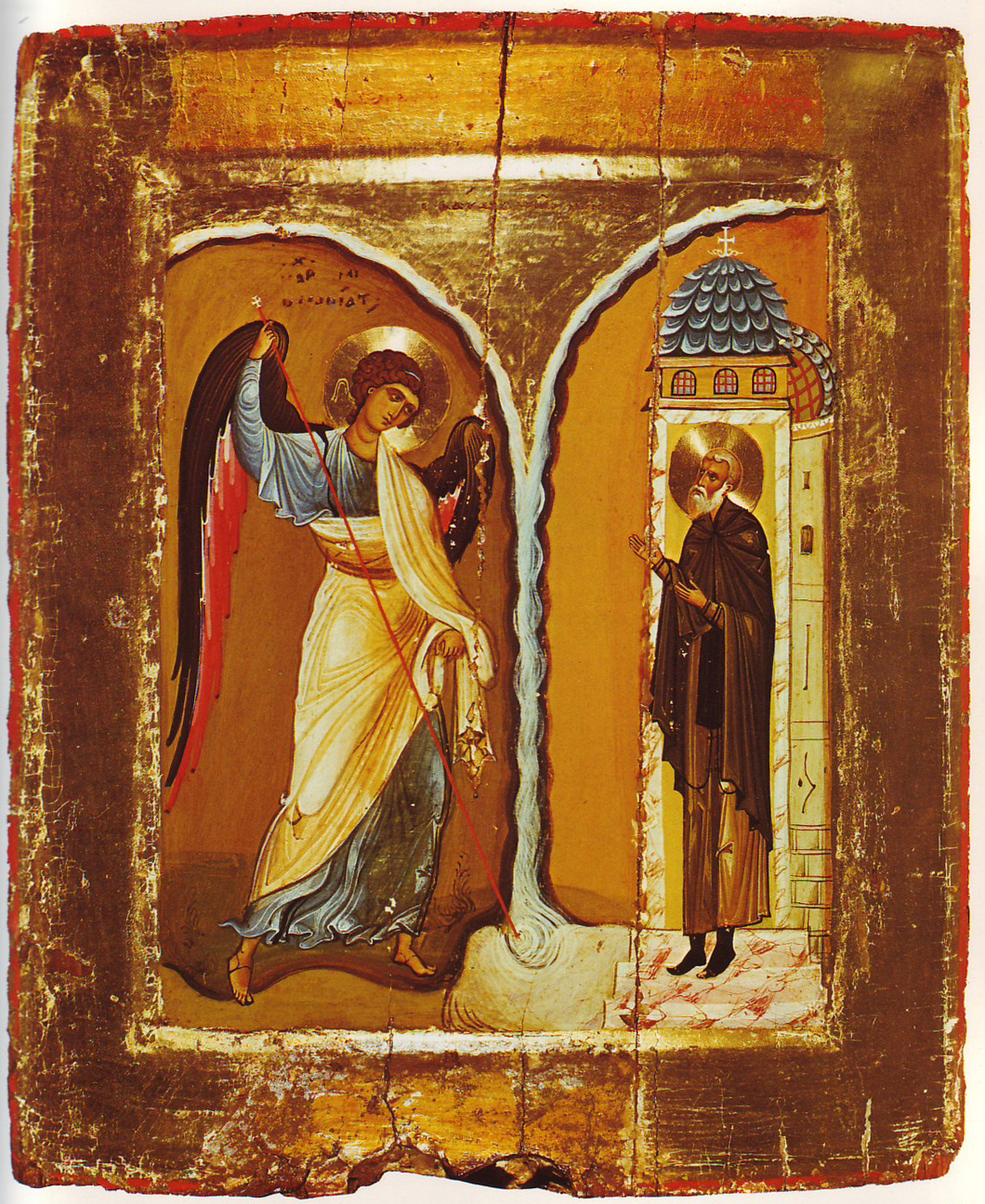
A 12th-century icon of the Miracle at Chonae, from Saint Catherine's Monastery, Mount Sinai

The Eastern Orthodox Church celebrates the Miracle at Chonae on September 6. The pious legend surrounding the event states that John the Apostle, when preaching nearby, foretold the appearance of Michael at Cheretopa near Lake Salda, where a healing spring appeared soon after the Apostle left; in gratitude for the healing of his daughter, one pilgrim built a church on the site. Local pagans, who are described as jealous of the healing power of the spring and the church, attempt to drown the church by redirecting the river, but the Archangel, "in the likeness of a column of fire", split the bedrock to open a new bed for the stream, directing the flow away from the church. The legend is supposed to predate the actual events, but the fifth- to seventh-century texts that refer to the miracle at Chonae formed the basis of specific paradigms for "properly approaching" angelic intermediaries for more effective prayers within Christian culture.

There is a late-fifth-century legend in Cornwall, England, that the Archangel appeared to fishermen on St Michael's Mount. According to author Richard Freeman Johnson, this legend is likely a nationalistic twist to a myth. Cornish legends also hold that the mount itself was constructed by giants and that King Arthur battled a giant there.

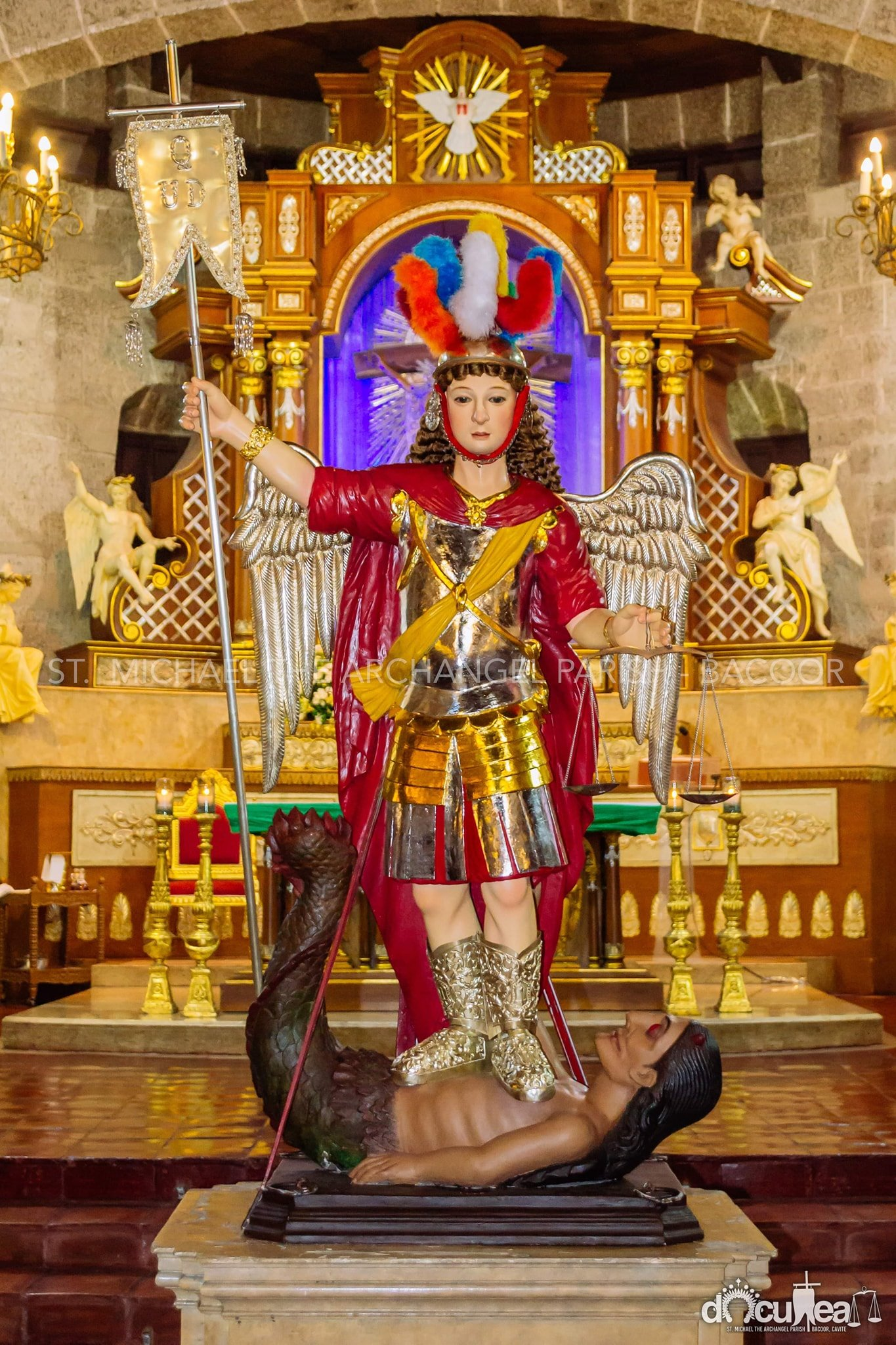
An 18th-century statue of a triumphant Saint Michael, enshrined as the patron of Bacoor, Cavite, Philippines. The town fiesta was originally on May 8, the Feast of the Apparition at Mount Gargano.

The legend of the apparition of the Archangel at around AD 490 at a secluded hilltop cave on Monte Gargano in Italy gained a following among the Lombards in the immediate period thereafter, and by the eighth century, pilgrims arrived from as far away as England. The Tridentine calendar included a feast of the apparition on 8 May, the date of the 663 victory over the Greek Neapolitans that the Lombards of Manfredonia attributed to Saint Michael. The feast remained in the Roman liturgical calendar until removed in the revision of Pope John XXIII. The Sanctuary of Monte Sant'Angelo at Gargano is a major Catholic pilgrimage site.

According to Roman legends, Archangel Michael appeared with a sword over the mausoleum of Hadrian while a devastating plague persisted in Rome, in apparent answer to the prayers of Pope Gregory I the Great (c. 590–604) that the plague should cease. After the plague ended, in honor of the occasion, the pope called the mausoleum "Castel Sant'Angelo" (Castle of the Holy Angel), the name by which it is still known.

According to Norman legend, Michael is said to have appeared to St Aubert, Bishop of Avranches, in 708, giving instruction to build a church on the rocky islet now known as Mont Saint-Michel. In 960 the Duke of Normandy commissioned a Benedictine abbey on the mount; it remains a major pilgrimage site.

A Portuguese Carmelite nun, Antónia d'Astónaco, reported an apparition and private revelation of the Archangel Michael who had told to this devoted Servant of God, in 1751, that he would like to be honored, and God glorified, by the praying of nine special invocations. These invocations correspond to invocations to the nine choirs of angels and origins the famous Chaplet of Saint Michael. This private revelation and prayers were approved by Pope Pius IX in 1851.

From 1961 to 1965, four young schoolgirls had reported several apparitions of the Archangel Michael in the small village of Garabandal, Spain. At Garabandal, the apparitions of the Archangel Michael were mainly reported as announcing the arrivals of the Virgin Mary. The Catholic Church has neither approved nor condemned the Garabandal apparitions.

== In literature, music, and art ==
=== Literature ===
In the 1667 English epic poem Paradise Lost by John Milton, Michael commands the army of angels loyal to God against the rebel forces of Satan. Armed with a sword from God's armory, he bests Satan in personal combat, wounding his side.

In Henry Wadsworth Longfellow's translation of the mid-thirteenth century The Golden Legend, Michael is one of the angels of the seven planets. He is the angel of Mercury.

=== Music ===
Marc-Antoine Charpentier, Praelium Michaelis Archangeli factum in coelo cum dracone, H.410, oratorio for soloists, double chorus, strings and continuo (1683).

Ottorino Respighi composed 'Vetrate di Chiesa' (The Church Windows) in 1926. The second movement is titled "Saint Michael the Archangel"

=== Artistic depictions ===
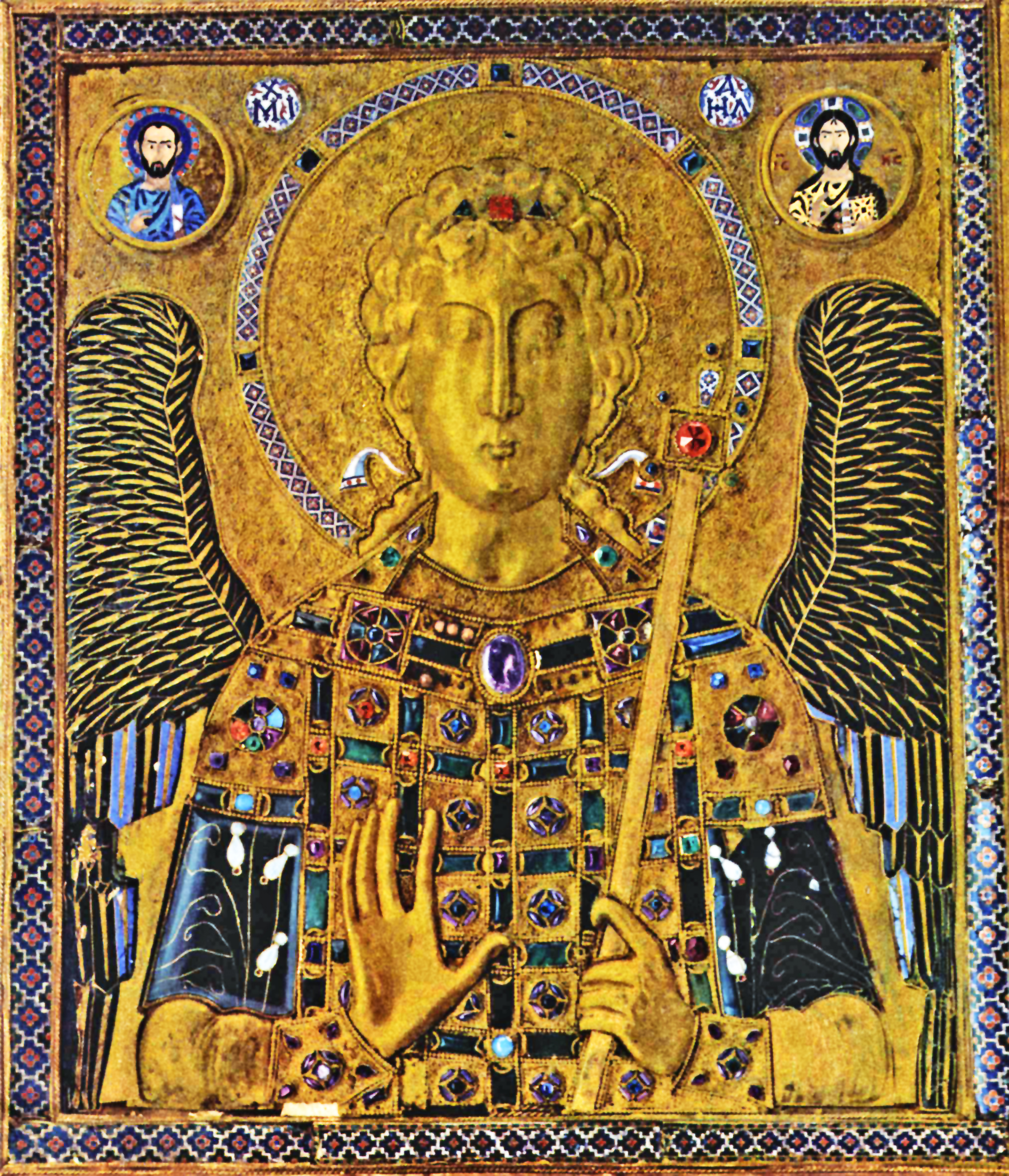
Tenth-century gold and enamel Byzantine icon of St Michael, in the treasury of the St Mark's Basilica

In Christian art, Archangel Michael may be depicted alone or with other angels such as Gabriel. Some depictions with Gabriel date back to the eighth century, e.g. the stone casket at Notre Dame de Mortain church in France.

The widely reproduced image of Our Mother of Perpetual Help, an icon of the Cretan school, depicts Michael on the left carrying the lance and sponge of the crucifixion of Jesus, with Gabriel on the right side of Mary and Jesus.

In many depictions, Michael is represented as an angelic warrior, fully armed with helmet, sword, and shield. The shield may bear the Latin inscription Quis ut Deus or the Greek inscription Christos Dikaios Krites or its initials. He may be standing over a serpent, a dragon, or the defeated figure of Satan, whom he sometimes pierces with a lance. The iconography of Michael slaying a serpent goes back to the early fourth century, when Emperor Constantine defeated Licinius at the Battle of Adrianople in AD 324, not far from the Michaelion, a church dedicated to Archangel Michael.

Constantine felt that Licinius was an agent of Satan and associated him with the serpent described in the Book of Revelation (12:9). After the victory, Constantine commissioned a depiction of himself and his sons slaying Licinius represented as a serpent a symbolism borrowed from the Christian teachings on the Archangel to whom he attributed the victory. A similar painting, this time with the Archangel Michael himself slaying a serpent, then became a major art piece at the Michaelion and eventually lead to the standard iconography of the Archangel Michael as a warrior saint.

In less common depiction, Michael holds a pair of scales, weighs the souls of the departed and holds the book of life (as in the Book of Revelation) to show he partakes in the judgment. Michelangelo depicted this scene on the altar wall of the Sistine Chapel.

In Byzantine art, Michael was often shown as a princely court dignitary rather than a warrior who battled Satan or with scales for weighing souls on the Day of Judgement.

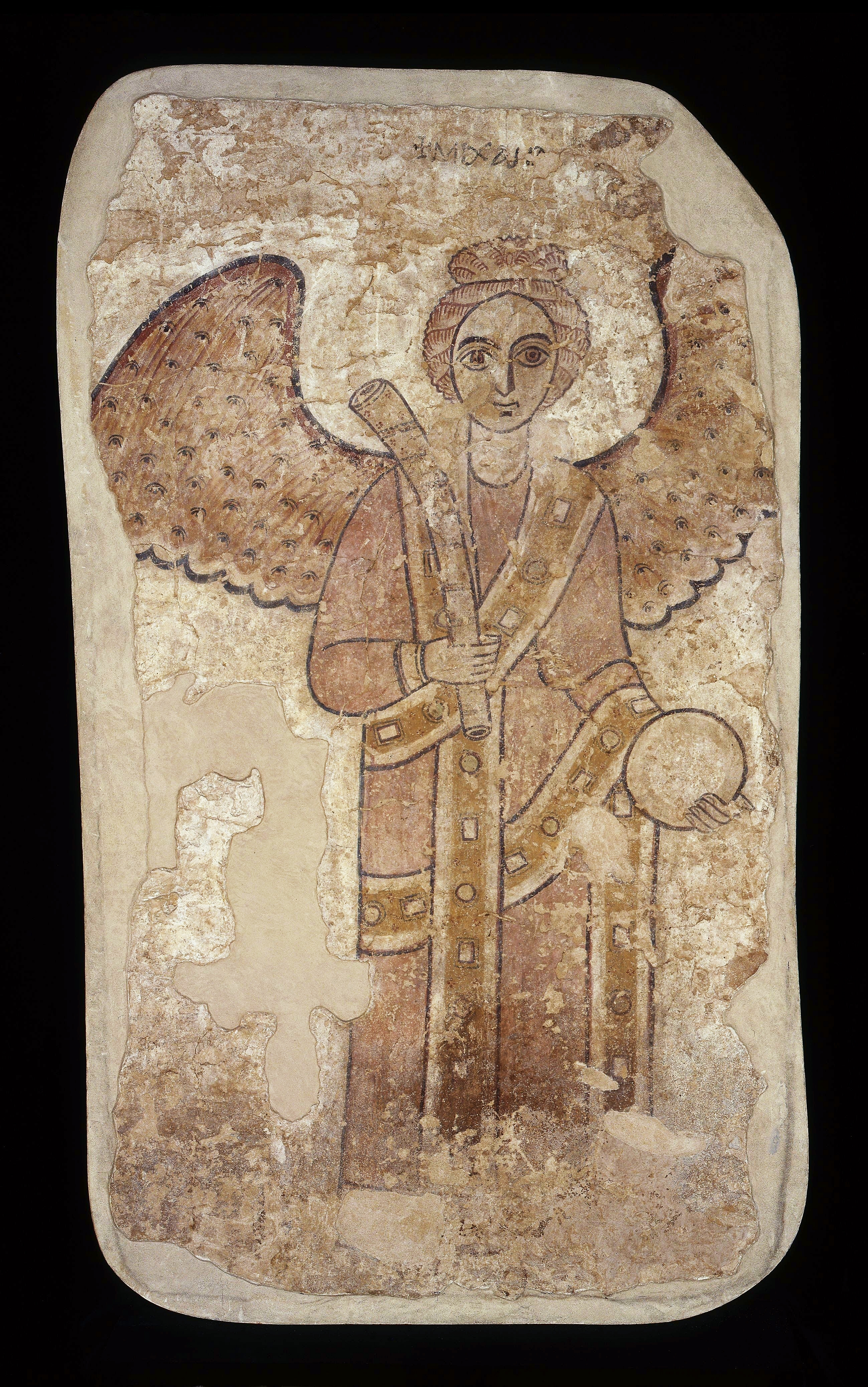
Archangel Michael on a 9th-century Makurian mural

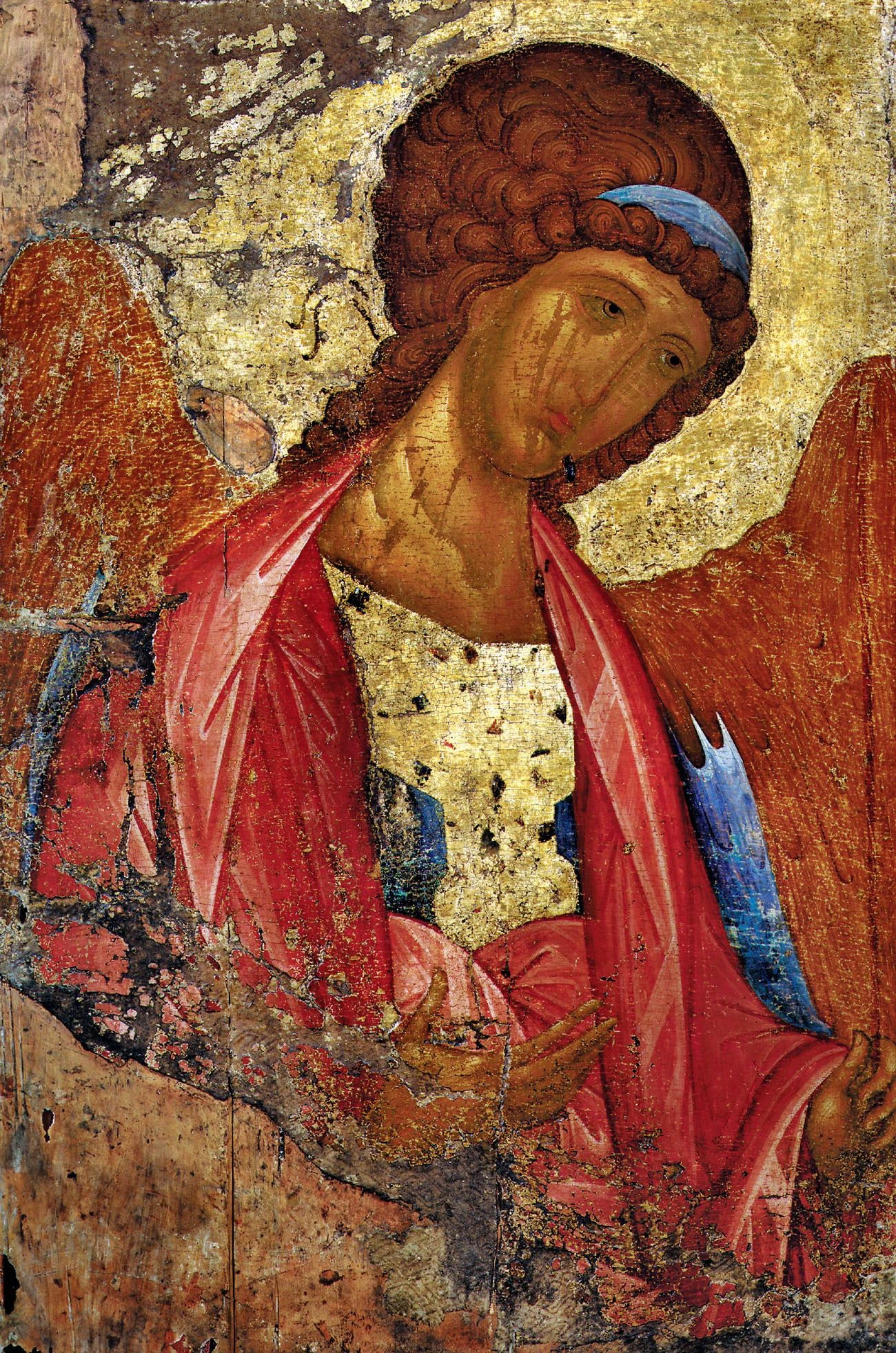
Andrei Rublev's standalone depiction c. 1408

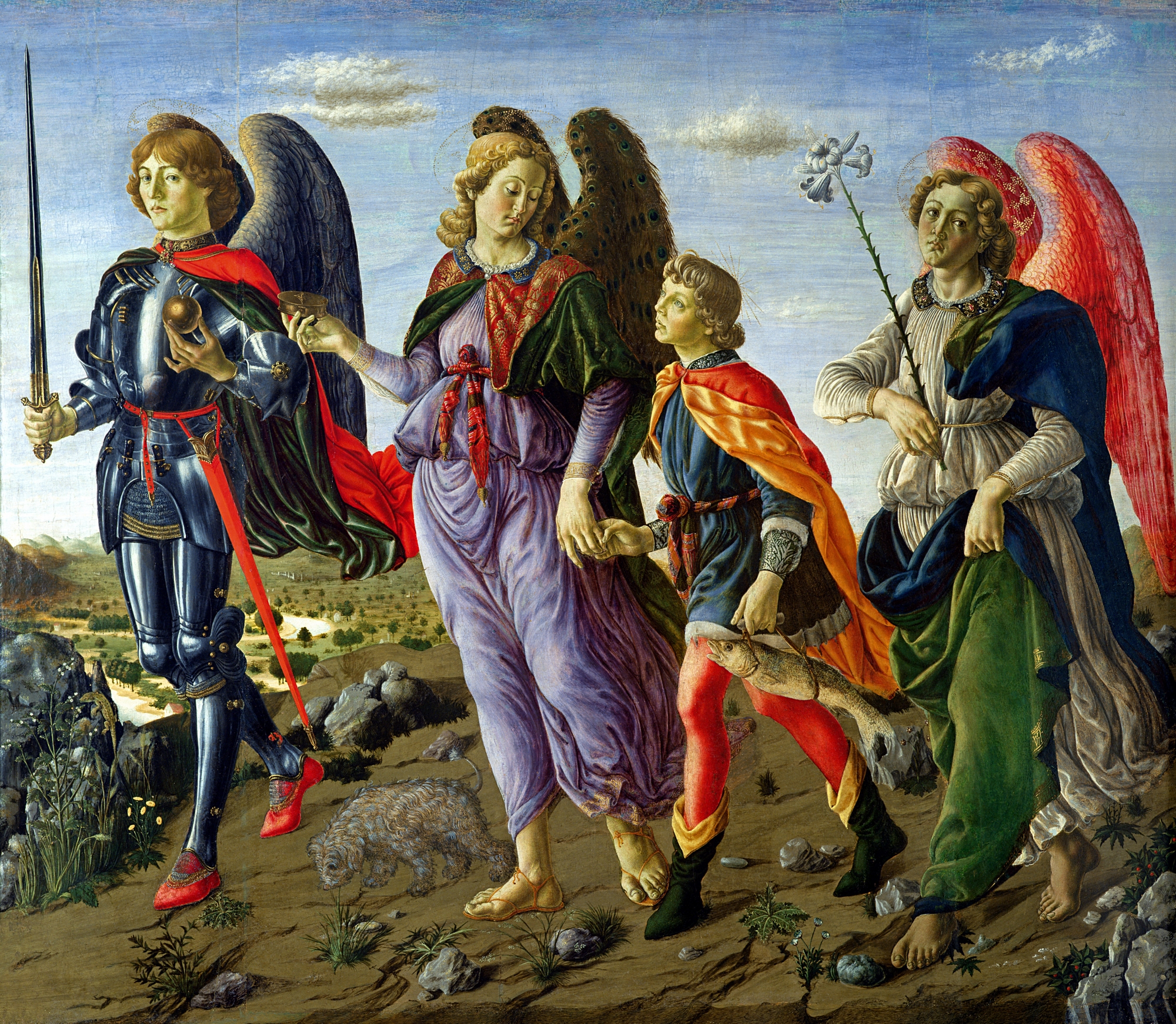
Michael (left) with archangels Raphael and Gabriel, by Botticini, 1470

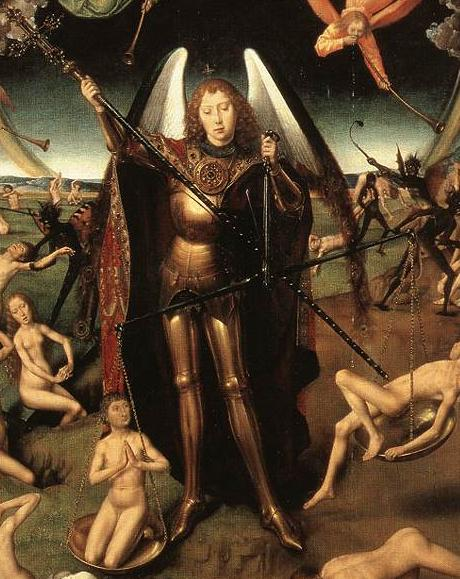
Weighing souls on Judgement Day by Hans Memling, 15th century

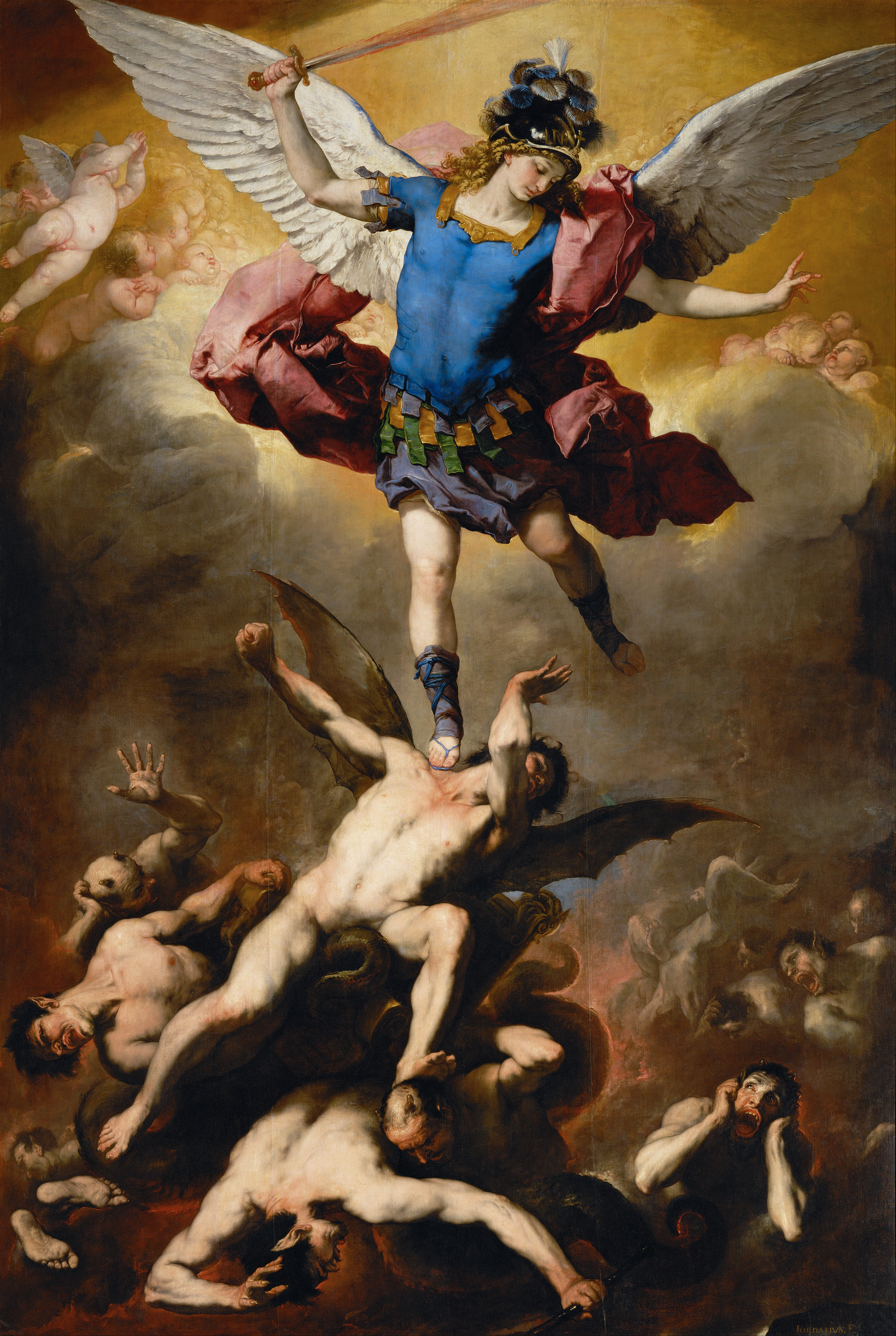
The Fall of the Rebel Angels, by Luca Giordano c. 1660–1665

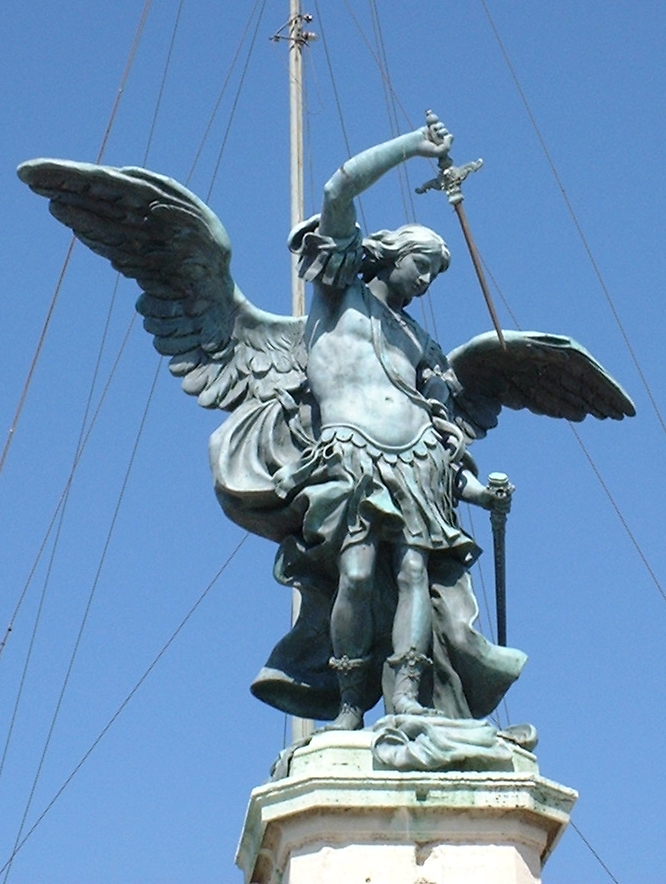
Bronze statue of the Archangel Michael, standing on top of the Castel Sant'Angelo, modelled in 1753 by Peter Anton von Verschaffelt.

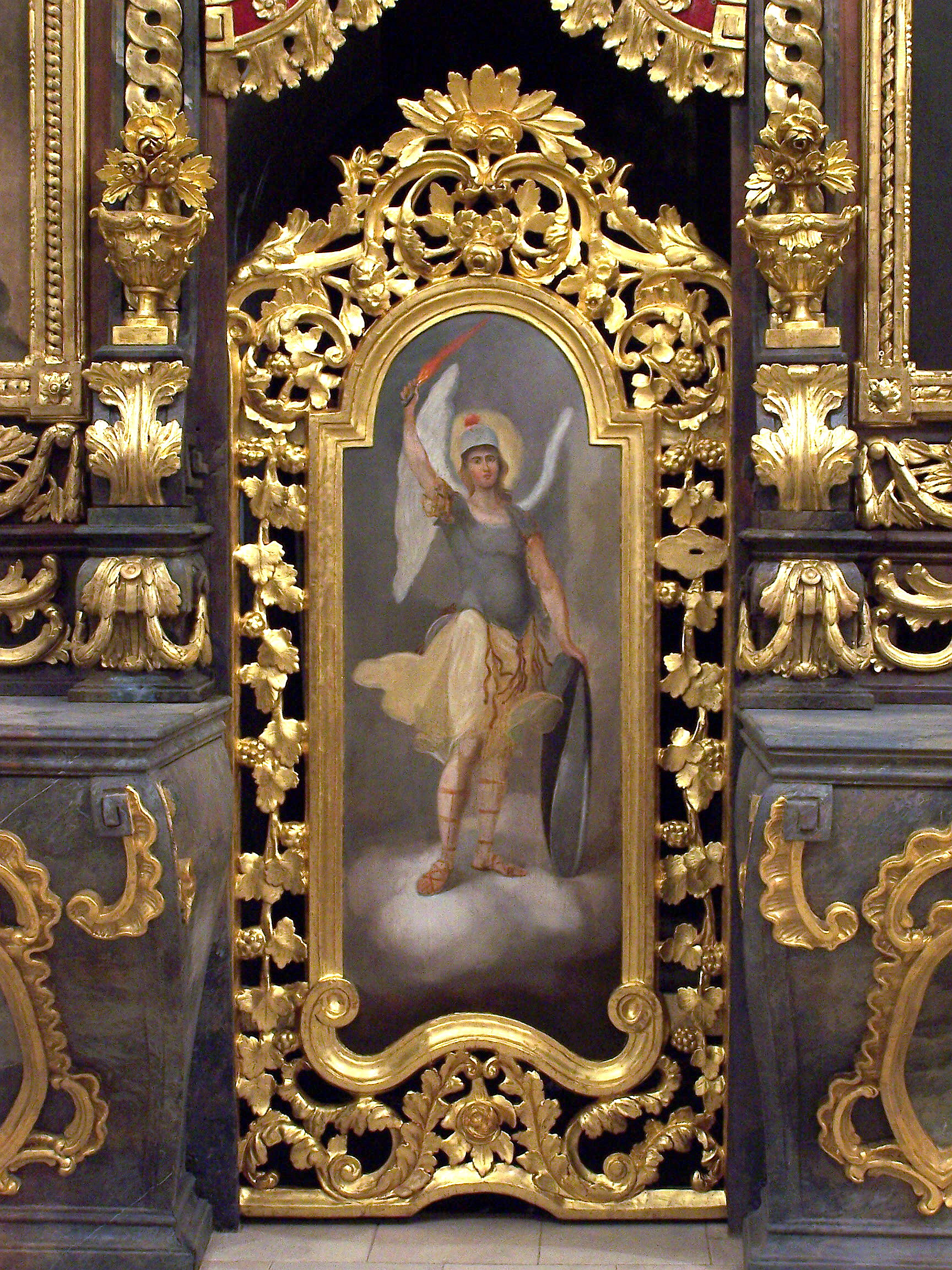
Michael's icon on the northern deacons' door on the iconostasis of Hajdúdorog. The archangel is often depicted on iconostases' doors as a defender of the sanctuary.

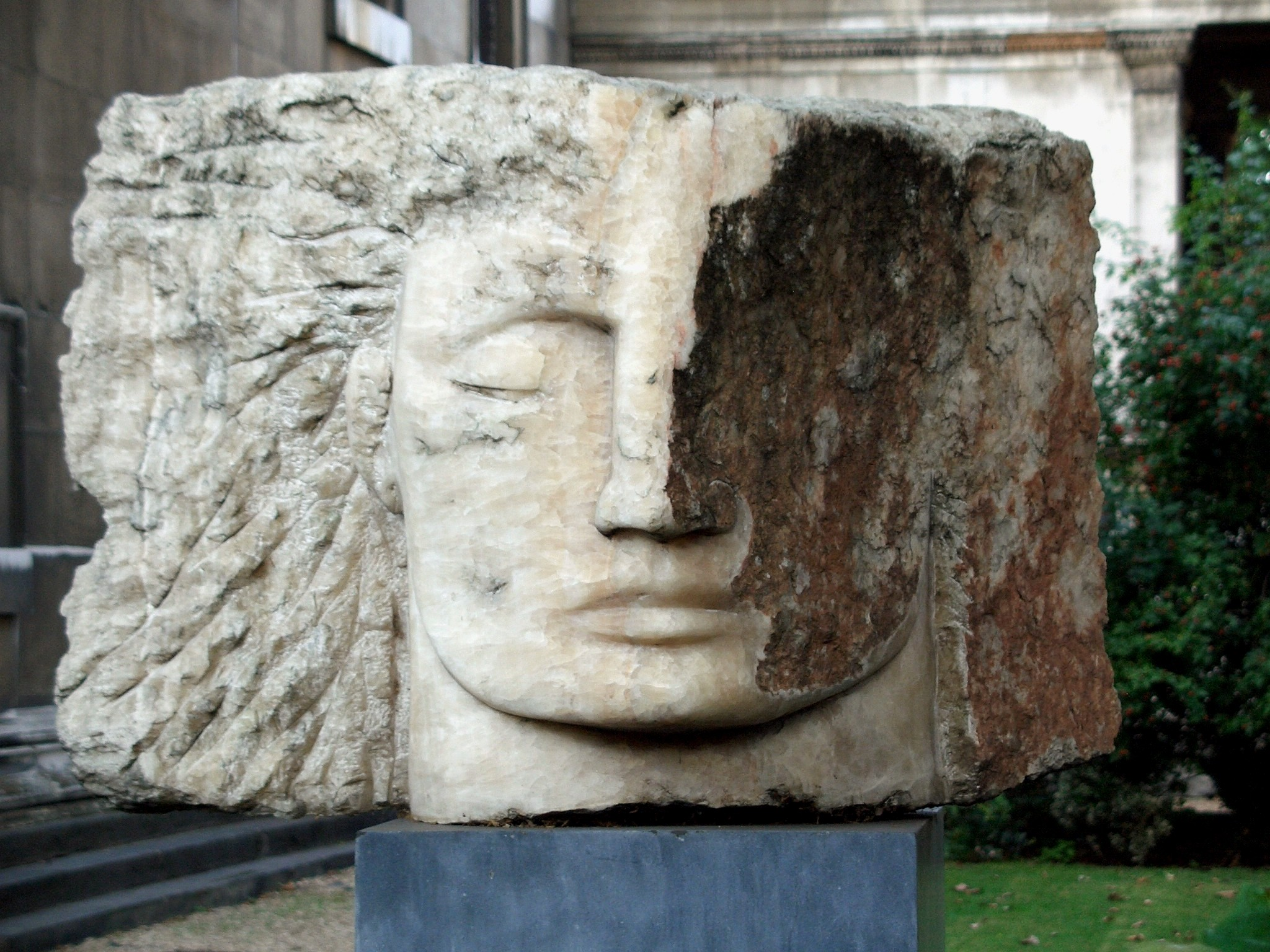
Archangel Michael by Emily Young in the grounds of St Pancras New Church. Plaque inscription: "In memory of the victims of the 7th July 2005 bombings and all victims of violence. 'I will lift up my eyes unto the hills'"

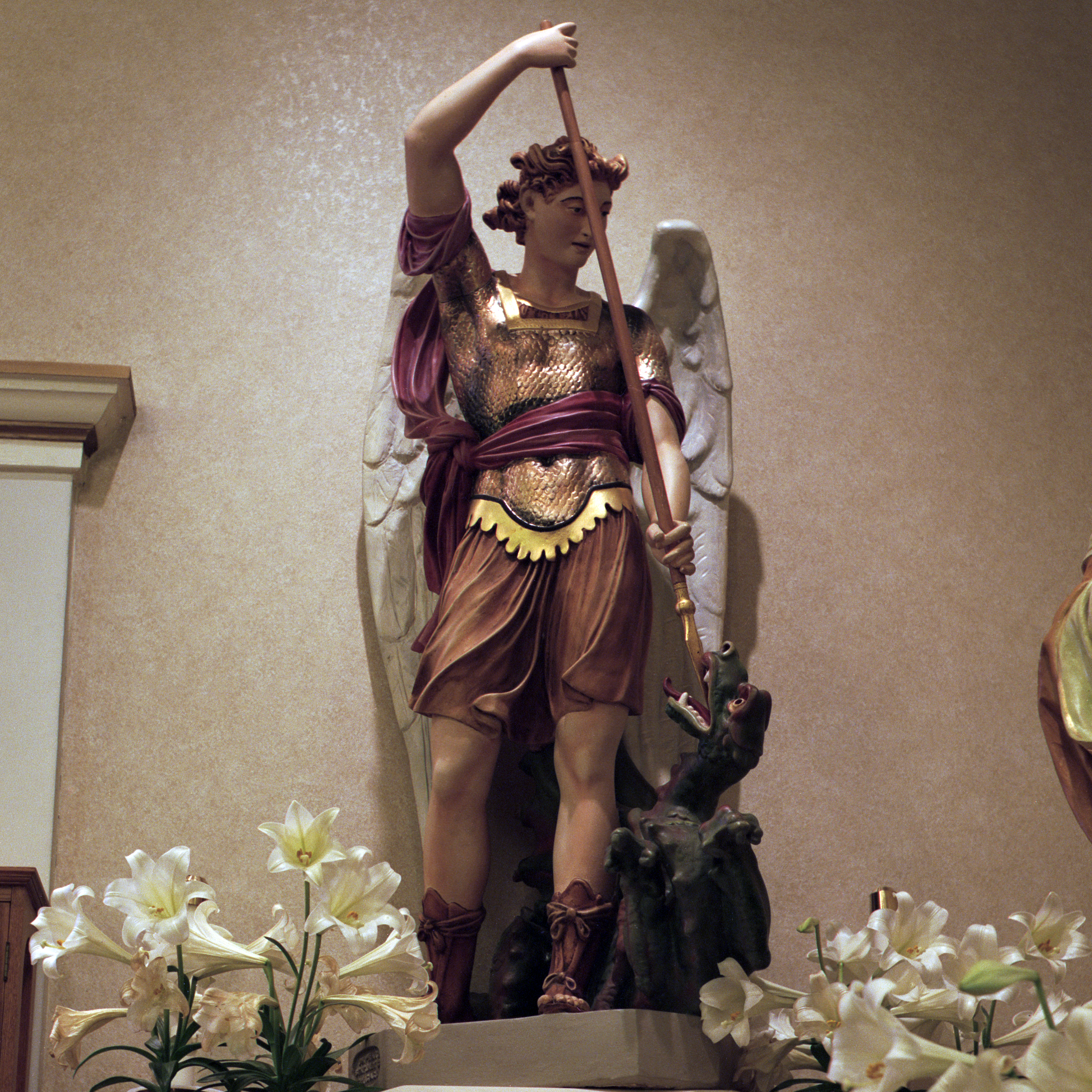
St. Michael the Archangel and the Dragon. Queen of Archangels Roman Catholic Parish, Clarence, Pennsylvania

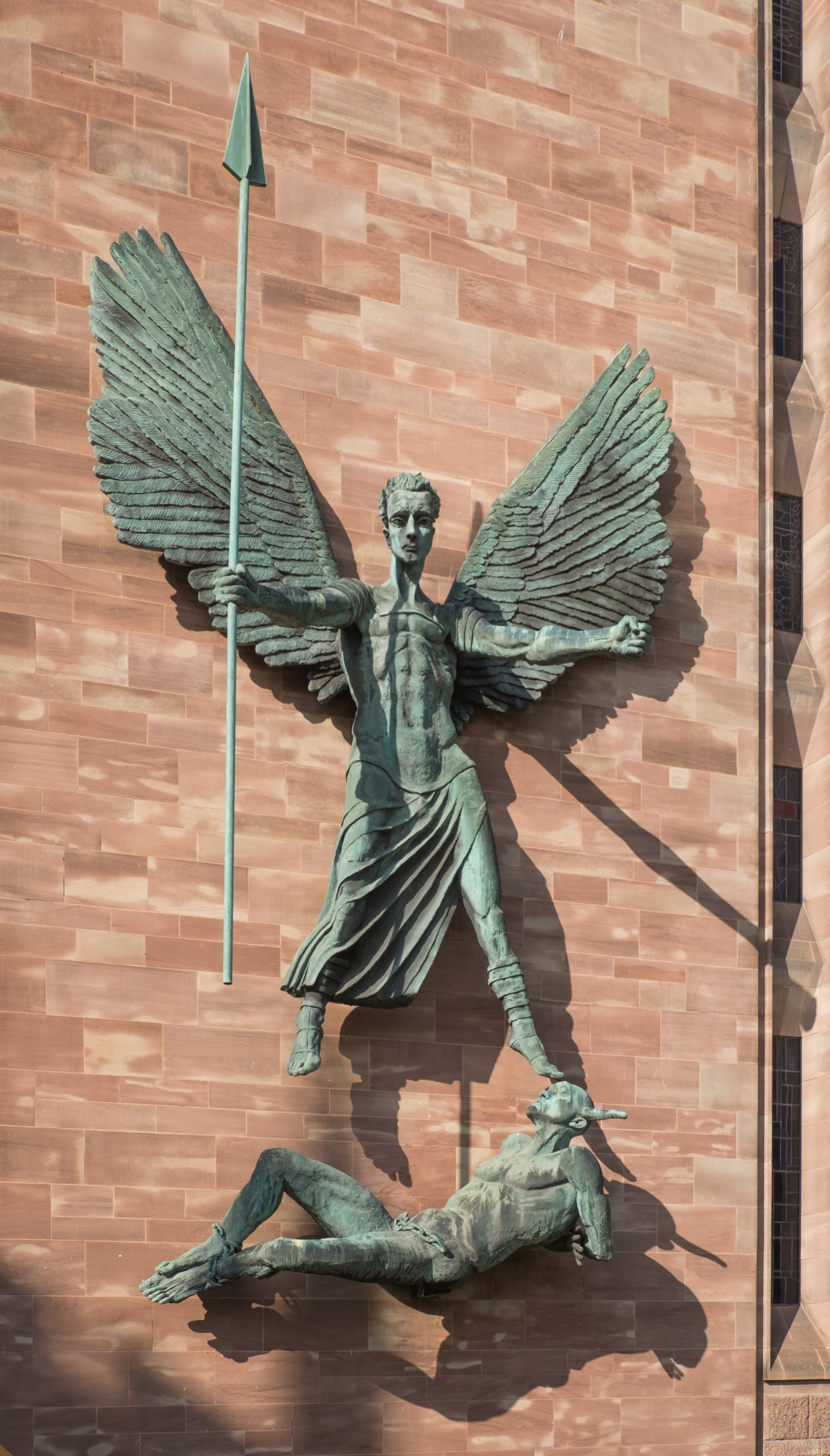
St Michael's Victory over the Devil, a 1958 sculpture by Jacob Epstein on the wall of the new Coventry Cathedral, England

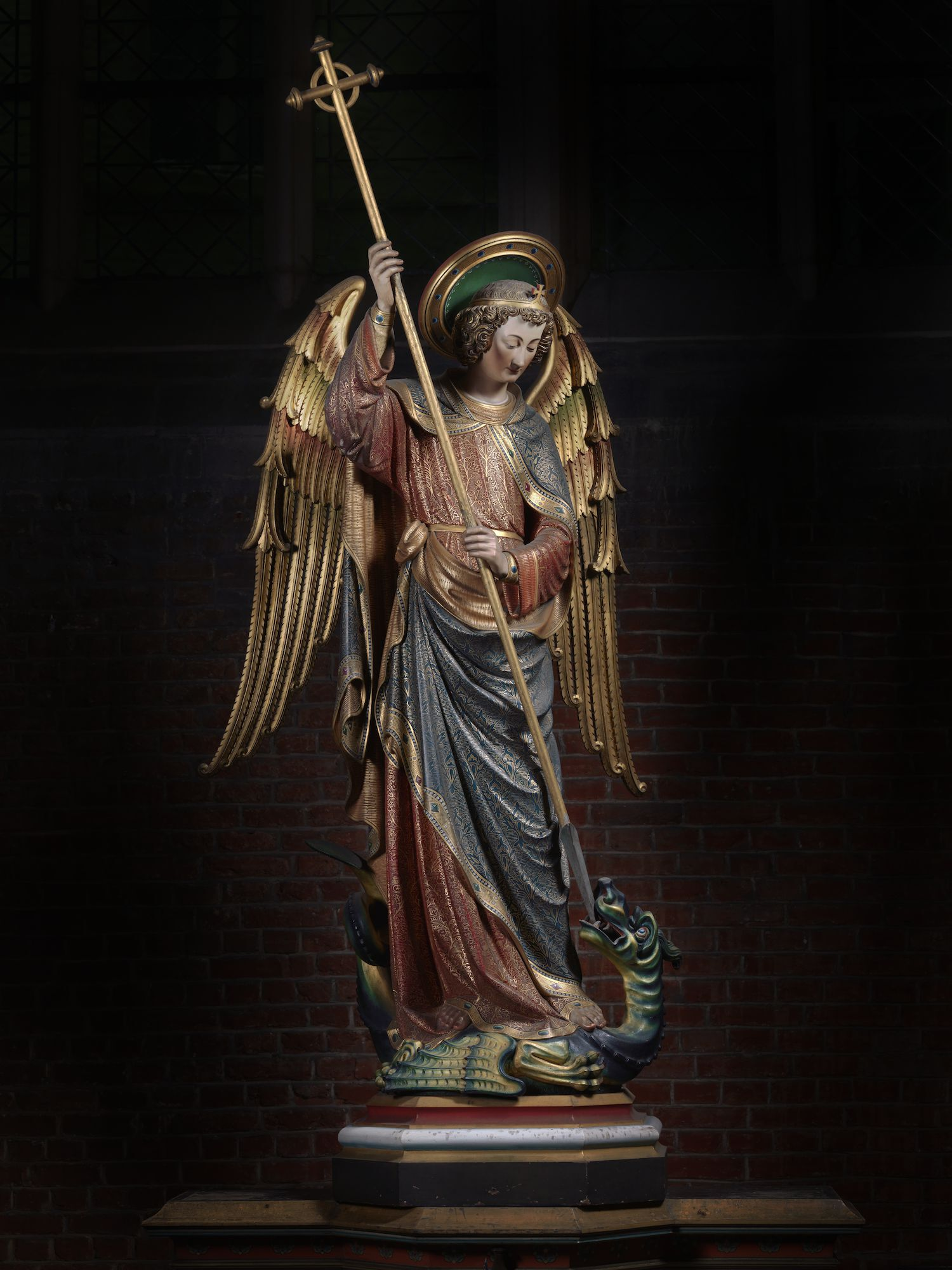
Archangel Michael tramples the dragon, Saint Michael's Church, Ghent

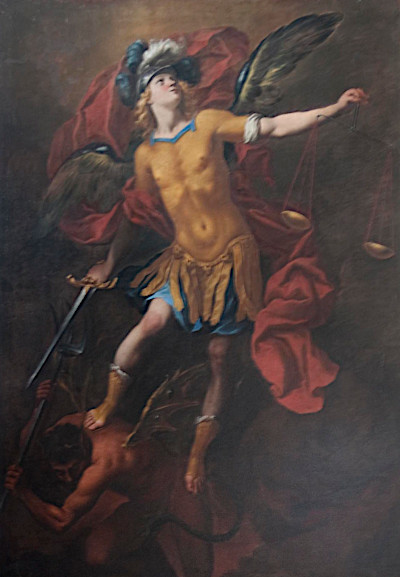
Altarpiece in Chiesa di San Michele Arcangelo, Garbagna Novarese, Italy, 18th century

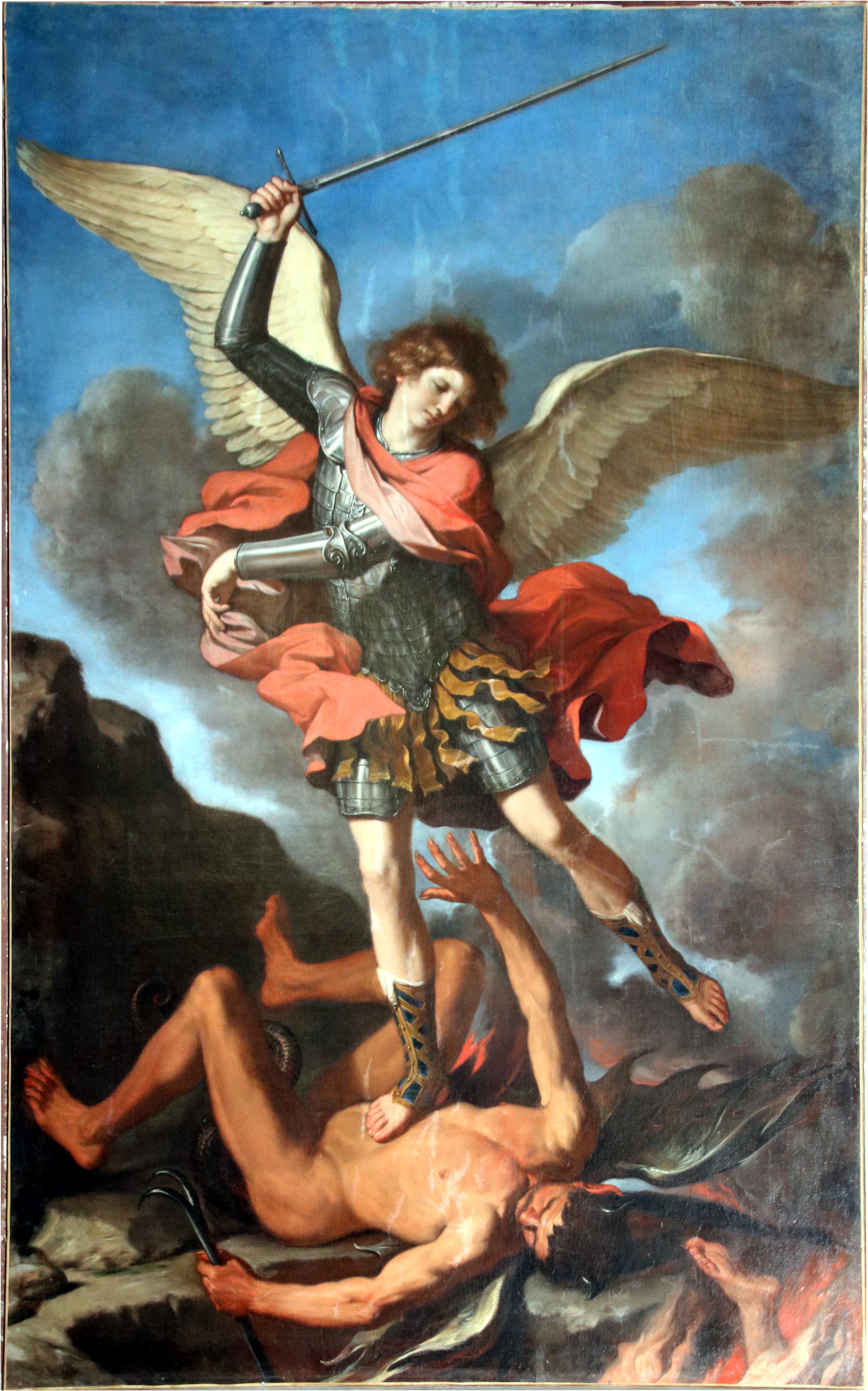
San Michele Arcangelo che abbatte il diavolo, by Guercino, 17th century, Church of San Nicolò (Fabriano), Italy

== Churches dedicated to Saint Michael ==
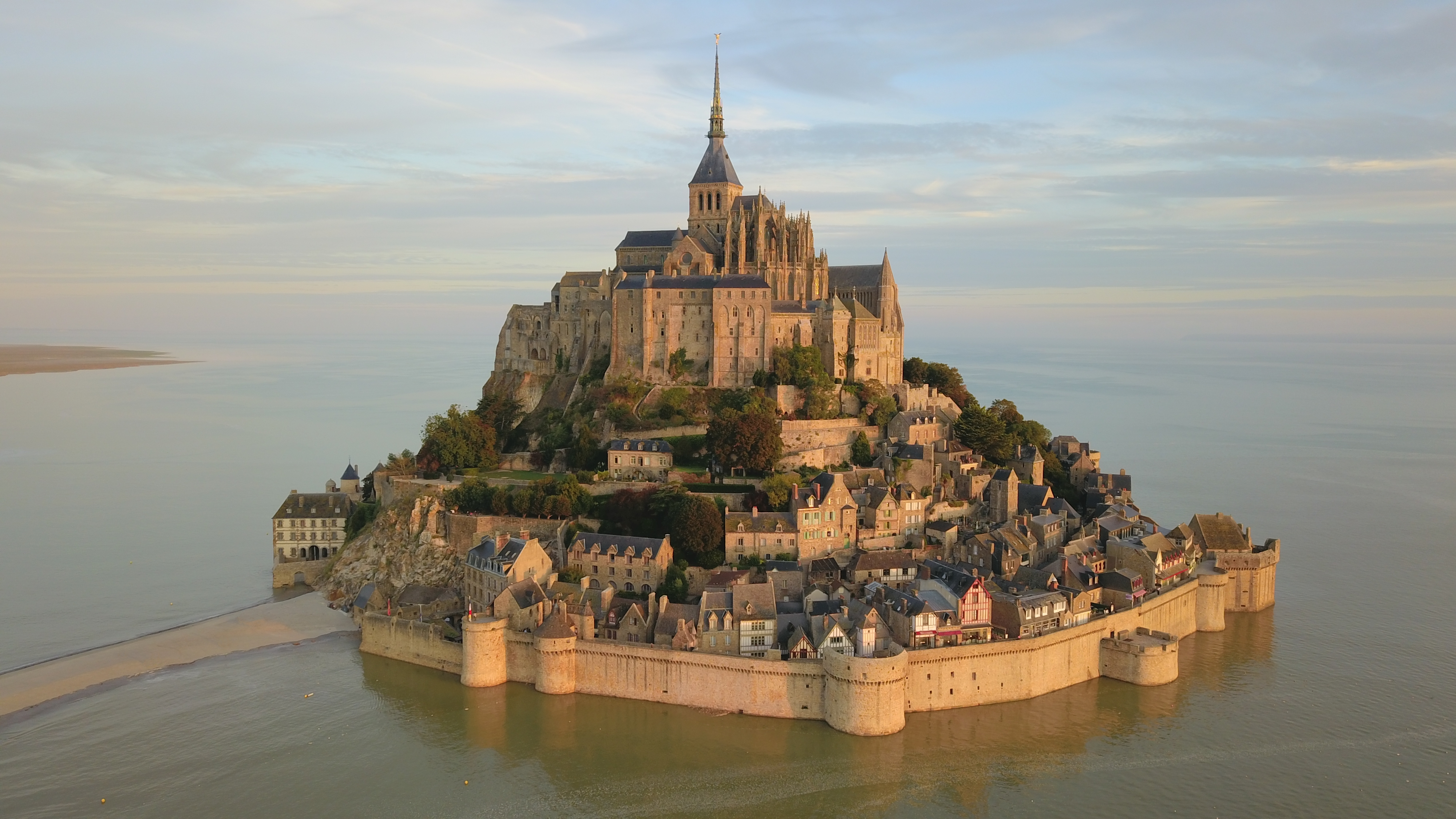
Mount Saint-Michel in Normandy, France – a World Heritage Site

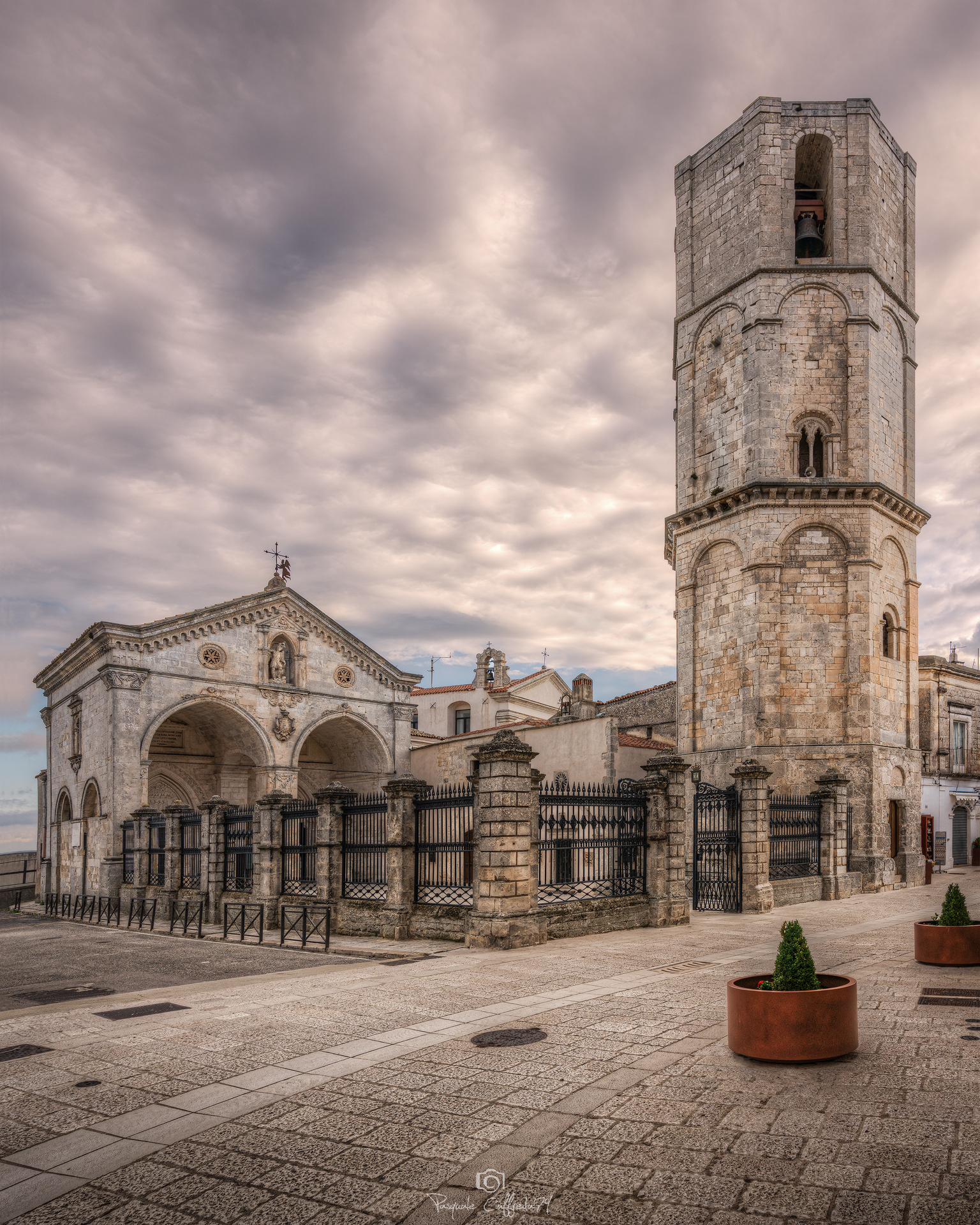
Sanctuary of St. Michael the Archangel in Gargano, Italy – a World Heritage Site

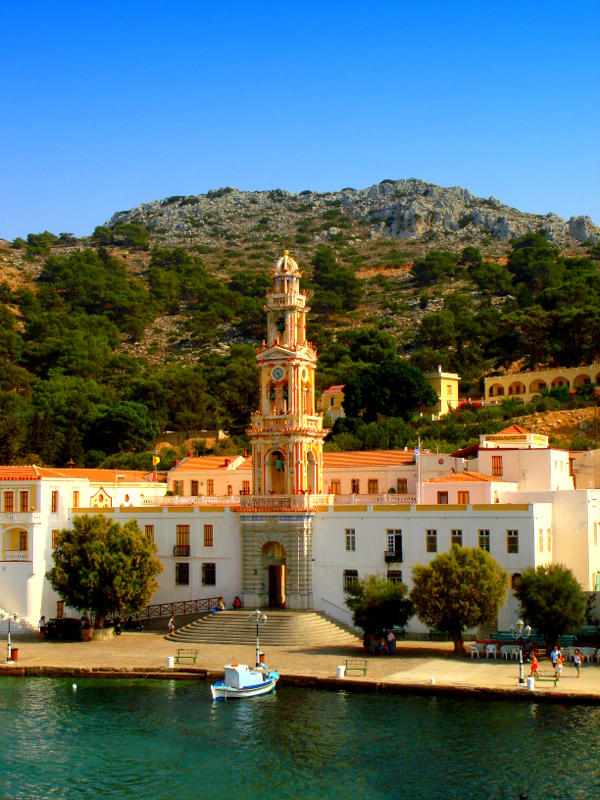
Saint Michael monastery of Panormitis in Symi, Greece – part of Saint Michael's line

- Parroquia de San Miguel Arcángel (es), San Miguel de Allende, Guanajuato Mexico World Heritage Site
- Sacra di San Michele (Saint Michael's Abbey), near Turin, Italy
- Church of St. Michael in Štip, Macedonia
- Pfarrei Brixen St. Michael with the White Tower, Brixen, Italy
- Cathedral of St. Michael and St. Gudula, in Brussels, Belgium
- Mont Saint-Michel, Normandy, France – a World Heritage Site
- St. Michael's Cathedral Basilica (Toronto), Canada
- St. Michael's Cathedral (Izhevsk), Russia
- St. Michael's Cathedral, Qingdao, China
- St. Michael's Catholic Church, Sharjah, United Arab Emirates
- Chudov Monastery in the Moscow Kremlin
- Cathedral of the Archangel in the Moscow Kremlin – a World Heritage Site
- Sanctuary of Monte Sant'Angelo, Gargano, Italy – a World Heritage Site
- St Michael's Mount, Cornwall, UK
- St. Michael, Minnesota
- St. Michael's Basilica, Miramichi, Canada
- Skellig Michael, off the Irish west coast – a World Heritage Site
- St Michael's Cathedral, Coventry, UK
- St. Michael's Golden-Domed Monastery, Kyiv, Ukraine
- St. Michael's Church, Vienna in Vienna, Austria
- Tayabas Basilica, Tayabas, Quezon, Philippines
- St. Michael's Church, Berlin, Germany
- San Miguel Church (Manila), Philippines
- St. Michael's Jesuit church, Munich, Germany
- St. Michael's Cathedral, Belgrade in Belgrade, Serbia
- Cathedral of St. Michael the Archangel in Gamu, Isabela, Philippines
- Mission San Miguel Arcángel, San Miguel, California, United States, one of the California Missions
- St Michael at the North Gate, Oxford, UK
- St. Michael's Roman Catholic church, Cluj-Napoca, Romania
- St. Michael's Church, Mumbai, India
- St Michael and All Angels Church, Polwatte
- St Michael's Church, Churchill, UK
- San Miguel Arcangel Church, Marilao, Bulacan, Philippines
- San Miguel Arcangel Church, San Miguel, Bulacan, Philippines
- St. Michael the Archangel Parish, Bacoor, Cavite, Philippines
- St Michael the Archangel, Llanyblodwel, England
- Seven medieval churches in Iceland were dedicated to the saint, including one in Búðardalur in Skarðsströnd, Steinar in Eyjafjöll and Borg in Mýrar.

== See also ==
- Biblical cosmology
- List of angels in theology
- Archangel Michael in Christian art
- Saint Michael's line
