= William Lindsay Alexander =

19th-century Scottish church leader

William Lindsay Alexander FRSE LLD (24 August 1808 – 20 December 1884) was a Scottish church leader.

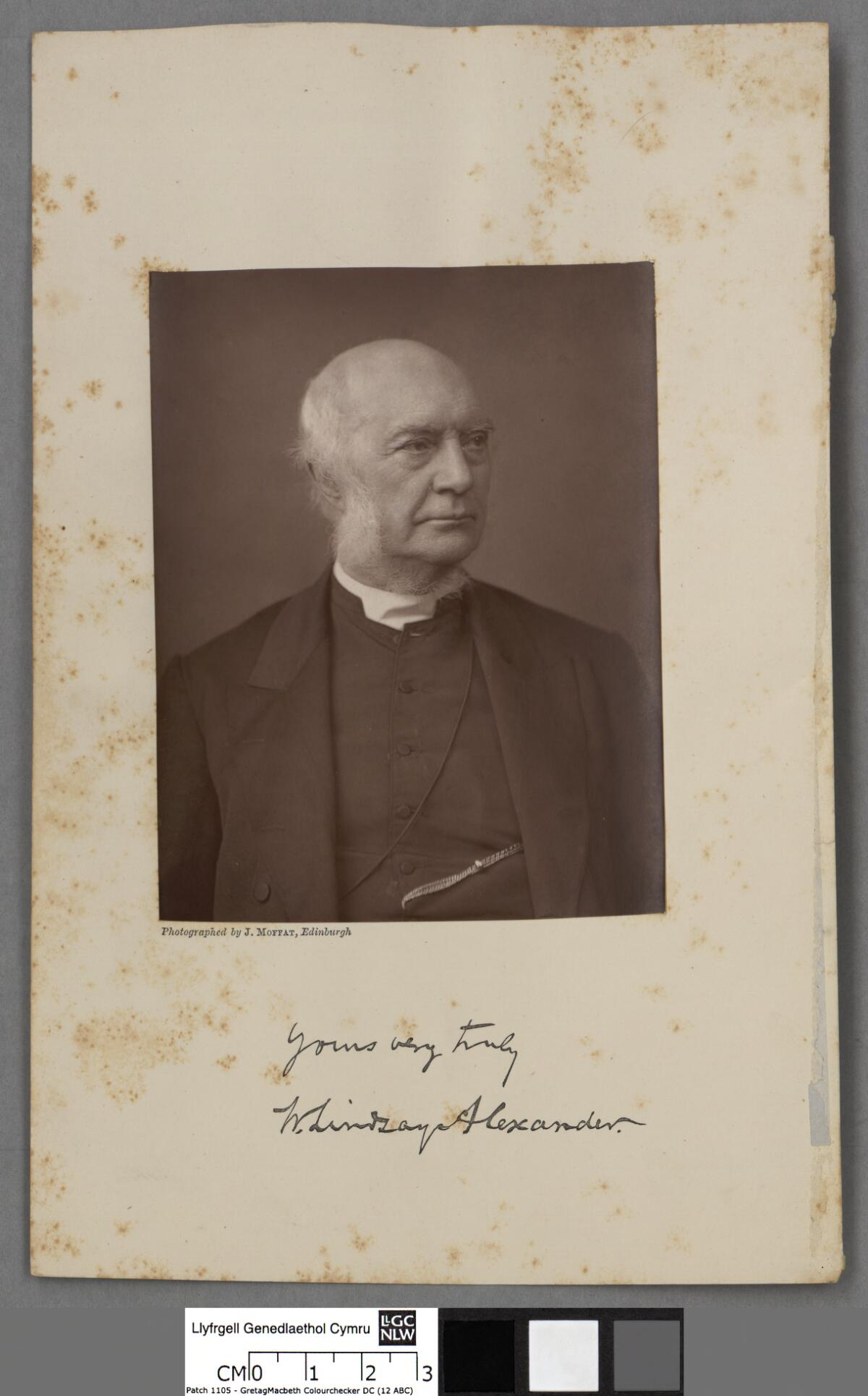
Dr William Lindsay Alexander, was a Scottish church leader.

== Life ==
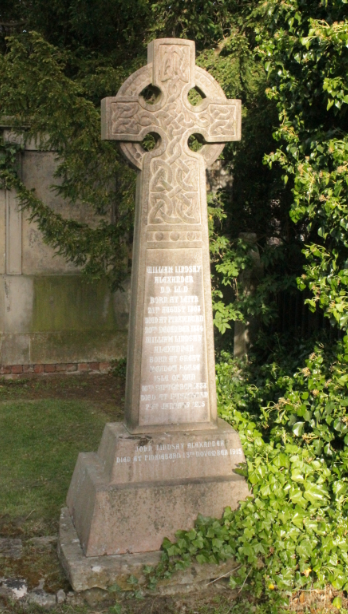
The grave of William Lindsay Alexander, Inveresk churchyard

He was born in Leith, the son of William Alexander, a wine merchant, and his wife, Elizabeth Lindsay. The only address given for his father appears in 1813 at 7 Blair Street off the Royal Mile in Edinburgh rather than Leith.

He was educated at Leith High School then the universities of St Andrews and Edinburgh, where he gained a lasting reputation for classical scholarship. He entered Glasgow Theological Academy under Ralph Wardlaw in September 1827, but in December of the same year he left to become classical tutor at the Blackburn Theological Academy, afterwards the Lancashire Independent College, in north-west England. He stayed at Blackburn until 1831, lecturing on biblical literature, metaphysics, Greek and Latin.

After short visits to Germany and London, he was invited back to Edinburgh in November 1834 to become minister of North College Street church (afterwards Argyle Square), an independent church which had arisen in 1802 out of the evangelical movement associated with the Haldane brothers, Robert and James. When the church sold its property to the government to make way for the National Museum of Scotland, Alexander's congregation worshipped in the Queen Street Hall until 1861 when the new church was completed on George IV Bridge, renamed Augustine Church because of Alexander's strong, albeit independent Augustinian influence in his sermons. He deliberately put aside the ambition to become a pulpit orator in favour of the practice of biblical exposition, which he invested with charm and impressiveness.

Alexander took an active part in the "voluntary" controversy which ended in the Disruption of 1843, but he also maintained broad and catholic views of the spiritual relations between different sections of the Christian church. In 1845 he visited Switzerland with the special object of inquiring into the religious life of the churches there. In 1845 he received the degree of Doctor of Divinity (D.D.) from the university of St Andrews.

In 1854 Alexander became Professor of Theology at Edinburgh (and Principal of the Edinburgh Theological Hall from 1877), a position which he held until 1881, in spite of many alternative offers.

In 1867 he was elected a Fellow of the Royal Society of Edinburgh. His address is then given as Pinkie Burn in Musselburgh. He served as its vice president from 1873 to 1878 and from 1880 to 1884.

He died at Pinkieburn House just south of Musselburgh and is buried nearby in Inveresk Churchyard. The grave lies in the south-east corner in the plot of Sir Alexander Hope.

== Works ==
Alexander published, besides sermons and pamphlets:

- The Connexion and Harmony of the Old and New Testaments (Congregational Lecture in London, 1840), 1841; 2nd edit. 1853.
- Anglo-Catholicism, Edinburgh, 1843.
- Switzerland and the Swiss Churches, Glasgow, 1846. An account of his Swiss journey in Switzerland and the Swiss Churches, it led to an interchange of correspondence between the Swiss and Scottish churches.
- The Ancient British Church [1852]; revised edition by Samuel Gosnell Green, 1889.
- Christ and Christianity, Edinburgh, 1854.
- Lusus Poetici, 1861, (privately printed; reprinted, with additions, in Ross's Life).
- Christian Thought and Work, Edinburgh, 1862.
- St. Paul at Athens, Edinburgh, 1865.
- Sermons, Edinburgh, 1875.

Posthumous was A System of Biblical Theology, Edinburgh, 1888, 2 vols. (edited by James Ross). He published also: memoirs of John Watson, minister at Musselburgh (1846), Ralph Wardlaw (1856), and William Alexander, his father (1867); expositions of Deuteronomy (Pulpit Commentary, 1882) and Zechariah (1885); and translations of Gustav Billroth on Corinthians (1837), Heinrich Andreas Christoph Havernick's Introduction to the Old Testament (1852), and Isaak August Dorner's History of the Doctrine of the Person of Christ, vol. i. (1864).

In 1861 Alexander undertook the editorship of the third edition of John Kitto's Biblical Encyclopaedia, with the understanding that the whole work should be revised and brought up to date. In January 1870 he became one of the committee of Old Testament revisers. He edited other theological works. His Hymns for Christian Worship reached a third edition in 1866.

Alexander frequently contributed to the British Quarterly, the British and Foreign Evangelical Review, Good Words, and other periodicals; he edited the Scottish Congregational Magazine, 1835-1840 and 1847–51. To the Encyclopædia Britannica (Eighth edition) he contributed several articles on topics of theology and philosophy (the publisher Adam Black was a member of his congregation). His articles on "Calvin" and "Channing" raised some controversy, and were changed in the ninth edition. He also contributed to the Imperial Dictionary of Biography.
