= August Hahn =

German theologian (1792–1863)

August Hahn (27 March 1792 – 13 May 1863) was a German Protestant theologian.

== Biography ==
Hahn was born at Großosterhausen (now part of Eisleben). He studied there, and then studied theology at the University of Leipzig and at Wittenberg. In 1819, he was nominated professor extraordinarius of theology and pastor at the Altstädtische Kirche in Königsberg in Prussia; and in 1820, he received a superintendency in that city. In 1822, he became professor ordinarius. In 1826, he became professor ordinarius of theology at Leipzig, where, hitherto distinguished only as editor of Bardesanes, Marcion (Marcions Evangelium in seiner ursprünglichen Gestalt, 1823), and Ephraem Syrus, and the joint editor of a Syrische Chrestomathie (1824), he came into great prominence as the author of the treatise De rationalismi qui dicitur vera indole et qua cum naturalismo contineatur ratione (1827), and also of an Offene Erklärung an die Evangelische Kirche zunächst in Sachsen und Preussen (1827), in which, as a member of the school of E. W. Hengstenberg, he endeavoured to convince the rationalists that it was their duty voluntarily and at once to secede from the Protestant churches.

In 1833, Hahn's pamphlet against K. G. Bretschneider (Über die Lage des Christenthums in unserer Zeit, 1832) having attracted the notice of Frederick William III, he was called to Breslau as theological professor and consistorial councillor at the Breslau Consistory, and in 1843 became general superintendent of the ecclesiastical province of Silesia. In 1845 as general superintendent he made it obligatory again that pastors in the Silesian ecclesiastical province had to declare their allegiance to the Augsburg Confession on their ordination, easing the conflict among Silesian Lutherans who fought the Prussian Union of churches of Lutheran and Reformed confession since 1817. However, this did not prevent anymore the royal recognition of the seceded Old Lutheran Evangelical Lutheran Church in Prussia in 1845, seated in Breslau. He died at Breslau.

== Writings ==
Though uncompromising in his supranaturalism, he did not altogether satisfy the men of his own school by his own doctrinal system. The first edition of his Lehrbuch des christlichen Glaubens (1828) was freely characterized as lacking in consistency and as detracting from the strength of the old positions in many important points. Many of these defects, however, he is considered to have remedied in his second edition (1857).

Other works:

- An edition of the Hebrew Bible (1833)
- Key to the Massoretic notes, titles, and index generally found in the margin of the Hebrew Bible (English translation by Alexander Meyrowitz)
- Novum Testamentum Graece Ex Recensione Augusti Hahnii, Denuo Editum (1841). Hahn’s text reproduced Elzevir's edition of the Received Text (p.iv), though he did provide alternate footnote readings from scholars such as Johann Griesbach, Karl Lachmann, Georg C. Knapp and Johann M. A. Scholz.
- Bibliothek der Symbole and Glaubensregeln der apostolisch-katholischen Kirche (1842; 2nd ed. 1877)
- Predigten (1852).

== Family ==
His son Heinrich was also a theologian.
