= Heinrich August Hahn =

German theologian

Heinrich August Hahn (19 June 1821 – 1 December 1861) was a German theologian and the eldest son of the theologian August Hahn.

== Life ==
Hahn was born in Königsberg. After studying theology at the universities of Breslau (Wrocław) and Berlin, he became successively a privatdozent at Breslau (1845), a professor ad interim (1846) at Königsberg on the death of Heinrich Havernick, an associate professor of theology (1851) and a full professor (1861) at the University of Greifswald.

== Selected works ==
Amongst his published works were a commentary on the Book of Job (1850), a translation of the Song of Songs (1852), an exposition of Isaiah xl.-lxvi. (1857) and a commentary on the Book of Ecclesiastes (1860).

- Veteris Testamenti Sententia De Natura Hominis Exposita : Commentatio Biblico Theologica, (1846).
- Commentar ueber das Buch Hiob (1850).
- Das Hohe Lied von Salomo, (1852).
- Commentar über das Predigerbuch Salomo's (1860).

With Franz Delitzsch, he edited and completed Moritz Drechsler's Der Prophet Jesaja ("The Prophet Isaiah").
