= Order of Saint Michael (disambiguation) =

Order of Saint Michael is a French dynastic order of knighthood founded in 1469 by King Louis XI of France.

Order of Saint Michael may also refer to:

== Chivalric orders ==
- Order of Saint Michael of the Wing, a Portuguese Catholic dynastic order traditionally founded in 1147 by King Afonso I of Portugal
- Order of Saint Michael (Bavaria), a Bavarian order of knighthood founded in 1693 by Joseph Clemens of Bavaria
- Order of St Michael and St George, a British dynastic order of knighthood founded in 1818 by George, Prince Regent, later George IV of the United Kingdom
- Order of Saint Michael the Archangel, a Russian dynastic order of knighthood founded in 1988 by Grand Duke Vladimir Kirillovich of Russia

== Religious orders ==
- Congregation of Saint Michael the Archangel, a catholic religious institute
