= Heinrich Andreas Christoph Havernick =

German theologian (1811–1845)

- Born: 29 December 1811; Kröpelin
- Died: 19 July 1845 (aged 33); Neustralitz
- Occupation: German Protestant theologian

Heinrich Andreas Christoph Havernick (29 December, 1811 – 19 July, 1845) was a German Protestant theologian known for his conservative views on the biblical Old Testament.

He studied theology at the universities of Leipzig and Halle, where he made the acquaintance of August Tholuck and was influenced by proponents of confessional orthodoxy. At Halle, he was involved in the turmoil of 1830 when advocates of orthodoxy demanded the dismissal of "rationalist" professors Wilhelm Gesenius and Julius Wegscheider (Accusations made against the two were partially based on lecture notes taken by Havernick). Afterwards, he studied theology in Berlin, where he was a disciple of Ernst Wilhelm Hengstenberg. He then taught classes in Geneva, and later relocated to the University of Rostock, where in 1837, he became an associate professor of theology. Four years later, he gained a full professorship at the University of Königsberg.

== Published works ==
- Commentar über das Buch Daniel, 1832 – Commentary on the Book of Daniel.
- Handbuch der historisch-kritischen Einleitung in das Alte Testament (volumes 1 and 2, 1836–39; volume 3 was published in 1849 by Carl Friedrich Keil). In 1850 it was translated into English and published as "An historico-critical introduction to the Pentateuch" (Edinburgh, T. & T. Clark, 1850).
- Neue kritische Untersuchungen über das Buch Daniel, 1838 – New exegetical investigations on the Book of Daniel.
- Commentar über den Propheten Ezechiel, 1843 – Commentary on the prophet Ezekiel.
- Vorlesungen über die Theologie des Alten Testaments, 1848 – Lectures on the theology of the Old Testament; published posthumously in 1848 by Heinrich August Hahn, a second edition was issued in 1863 by Hermann Schultz.
