= February 7 =

February 7 this year in various calendars
- Saturday, 7 February 2026
Akan	Kurumemene
Armenian	22 Mehekani 1475
Aztec	Etzalcualiztli 8, 3 Cōzcacuāuhtli
Babylonian	18 Tebetu, 2336 SE
Balinese pawukon	Luang, Pepet, Pasah, Menala, Keliwon, Paniron, Saniscara of Uye, Uma, Urungan, Raja
Bengali	24 Magh, BS 1432
Chinese	Yang Water Rat・Root Mansion; Wood Snake Year, Month 12, Day 20 (Lichun, 11 days until Yushui)
Common Era	7 February 2026 CE
Coptic	30 Tobi, AM 1742
Egyptian	27 Payni, 2774 NE
Ethiopian	30 Ṭer, 2018 Amätä Məhrät
French Republican	Décade II, Nonidi de Pluviôse de l'Année 234 de la République
Gregorian	7 February, AD 2026
Hebrew	20 Shevat, AM 5786
Hindu	Citrā・Dhṛti; Solar: 25 Māgha, 1947 SE; Lunisolar: Ṣaṣṭhī, Kṛishna pakṣa of Māgha, 2082 VE; Siddhārthin・5126 KY・1,872,613
Icelandic	Laugardagur, 16 Þorri 2025
Islamic	19 Sha'aban, AH 1447 (using tabular method)
ISO week date	2026-W06-6
Japanese	20 Shiwasu, Reiwa 8 (Risshun, 12 days until Usui)
Julian	25 January, AD 2026 (AM 7534)
Julian day	2461079
Korean	20 Sodal, 4358 DE
Maya	13.0.13.5.16; 14 Pax, 3 Cib
Roman	ante diem VIII Kalendas Februarias, MMDCCLXXIX AUC
Solar Hijri	18 Bahman, SH 1404
Tibetan	21 rgyal, shing mo sbrul 2152 or 1771 or 999

<<	February					>>
Su	Mo	Tu	We	Th	Fr	Sa
1	2	3	4	5	6	7
8	9	10	11	12	13	14
15	16	17	18	19	20	21
22	23	24	25	26	27	28
2026

February 7 in recent years
2026 (Saturday)
2025 (Friday)
2024 (Wednesday)
2023 (Tuesday)
2022 (Monday)
2021 (Sunday)
2020 (Friday)
2019 (Thursday)
2018 (Wednesday)
2017 (Tuesday)

February 7 is the 38th day of the year in the Gregorian calendar; 327 days remain until the end of the year (328 in leap years).

== Events ==
=== Pre-1600 ===
- 457 – Leo I becomes the Eastern Roman emperor.
- 987 – Bardas Phokas the Younger and Bardas Skleros, Byzantine generals of the military elite, begin a wide-scale rebellion against Emperor Basil II.
- 1285 – A synod at Blachernae convened by anti-Unionist Greek clergy condemns the former pro-Unionist patriarch John XI of Constantinople.
- 1301 – Edward of Caernarvon (later King Edward II of England) becomes the first English Prince of Wales.
- 1313 – King Thihathu founds the Pinya Kingdom as the de jure successor state of the Pagan Kingdom.
- 1365 – Albert III of Mecklenburg (King Albert of Sweden) grants city rights to Ulvila (Swedish: Ulvsby).
- 1497 – In Florence, Italy, supporters of Girolamo Savonarola burn cosmetics, art, and books, in a "Bonfire of the vanities".

=== 1601–1900 ===
- 1756 – Guaraní War: The leader of the Guaraní rebels, Sepé Tiaraju, is killed in a skirmish with Spanish and Portuguese troops.
- 1783 – American Revolutionary War: French and Spanish forces lift the Great Siege of Gibraltar.
- 1795 – The 11th Amendment to the United States Constitution is ratified.
- 1807 – Napoleonic Wars: Napoleon finds Bennigsen's Russian forces taking a stand at Eylau. After bitter fighting, the French take the town, but the Russians resume the battle the next day.
- 1812 – The strongest in a series of earthquakes strikes New Madrid, Missouri.
- 1813 – In the action of 7 February 1813 near the Îles de Los, the frigates Aréthuse and Amelia batter each other, but neither can gain the upper hand.
- 1819 – Sir Thomas Stamford Raffles leaves Singapore after just taking it over, leaving it in the hands of William Farquhar.
- 1842 – Battle of Debre Tabor: Ras Ali Alula, Regent of the Emperor of Ethiopia defeats warlord Wube Haile Maryam of Semien.
- 1854 – A law is approved to found the Swiss Federal Institute of Technology. Lectures started October 16, 1855.
- 1863 – HMS Orpheus sinks off the coast of Auckland, New Zealand, killing 189.
- 1894 – The Cripple Creek miner's strike, led by the Western Federation of Miners, begins in Cripple Creek, Colorado, United States.
- 1898 – Dreyfus affair: Émile Zola is brought to trial for libel for publishing J'Accuse...!
- 1900 – Second Boer War: British troops fail in their third attempt to lift the Siege of Ladysmith.
- 1900 – A Chinese immigrant in San Francisco falls ill to bubonic plague in the first plague epidemic in the continental United States.

=== 1901–present ===
- 1904 – The Great Baltimore Fire begins in Baltimore, Maryland; it destroys over 1,500 buildings in 30 hours.
- 1940 – The second full-length animated Walt Disney film, Pinocchio, premieres.
- 1943 – World War II: Imperial Japanese Navy forces complete the evacuation of Imperial Japanese Army troops from Guadalcanal during Operation Ke, ending Japanese attempts to retake the island from Allied forces in the Guadalcanal campaign.
- 1944 – World War II: In Anzio, Italy, German forces launch a counteroffensive during the Allied Operation Shingle.
- 1951 – Korean War: More than 700 suspected communist sympathizers are massacred by South Korean forces.
- 1962 – The United States bans all Cuban imports and exports.
- 1964 – The Beatles land in the United States for the first time, at the newly renamed John F. Kennedy International Airport.
- 1966 – The Great Fire of Iloilo breaks out in a lumber yard in Iznart Street and burns for almost half a day destroying nearly three-quarters of the City Proper area and Php 50 million pesos in total properties' damage.
- 1974 – Grenada gains independence from the United Kingdom.
- 1979 – Pluto moves inside Neptune's orbit for the first time since either was discovered.
- 1981 – A plane crash at Pushkin Airport kills 50 people, including 16 members of the Pacific Fleet.
- 1984 – Space Shuttle program: STS-41-B Mission: astronauts Bruce McCandless II and Robert L. Stewart make the first untethered space walk using the Manned Maneuvering Unit (MMU).
- 1986 – Twenty-eight years of one-family rule end in Haiti, when President Jean-Claude Duvalier flees the Caribbean nation.
- 1990 – Dissolution of the Soviet Union: The Central Committee of the Soviet Communist Party agrees to give up its monopoly on power.
- 1991 – Haiti's first democratically elected president, Jean-Bertrand Aristide, is sworn in.
- 1991 – The Troubles: The Provisional IRA launches a mortar attack on 10 Downing Street in London, the headquarters of the British government.
- 1992 – The Maastricht Treaty is signed, leading to the creation of the European Union.
- 1995 – Ramzi Yousef, the mastermind of the 1993 World Trade Center bombing, is arrested in Islamabad, Pakistan.
- 1999 – Crown Prince Abdullah becomes the King of Jordan on the death of his father, King Hussein.
- 2001 – Space Shuttle program: Space Shuttle Atlantis is launched on mission STS-98, carrying the Destiny laboratory module to the International Space Station.
- 2009 – Bushfires in Victoria leave 173 dead in the worst natural disaster in Australia's history.
- 2012 – President Mohamed Nasheed of the Republic of Maldives resigns, after 23 days of anti-governmental protests calling for the release of the Chief Judge unlawfully arrested by the military.
- 2013 – The U.S. state of Mississippi officially certifies the Thirteenth Amendment, becoming the last state to approve the abolition of slavery. The Thirteenth Amendment was formally ratified by Mississippi in 1995.
- 2014 – Scientists announce that the Happisburgh footprints in Norfolk, England, date back to more than 800,000 years ago, making them the oldest known hominid footprints outside Africa.
- 2016 – North Korea launches Kwangmyŏngsŏng-4 into outer space violating multiple UN treaties and prompting condemnation from around the world.
- 2021 – The 2021 Uttarakhand flood begins.
- 2024 – Pakistan election offices are hit by twin bombings, killing at least 24 people a day before general elections.

== Births ==
=== Pre-1600 ===
- 574 – Prince Shōtoku of Japan (died 622)
- 1102 – Empress Matilda, Holy Roman Empress and claimant to the English throne (probable; (died 1167)
- 1449 – Adriana of Nassau-Siegen, German countess (died 1477)
- 1478 – Thomas More, English lawyer and politician, Lord Chancellor of England (died 1535)
- 1487 – Queen Dangyeong, Korean royal consort (died 1557)
- 1500 – João de Castro, viceroy of Portuguese India (died 1548)

=== 1601–1900 ===
- 1612 – Thomas Killigrew, English playwright and manager (died 1683)
- 1622 – Vittoria della Rovere, Italian noble (died 1694)
- 1693 – Empress Anna of Russia (died 1740)
- 1722 – Azar Bigdeli, Iranian anthologist and poet (died 1781)
- 1726 – Margaret Fownes-Luttrell, English painter (died 1766)
- 1741 – Henry Fuseli, Swiss-English painter and academic (died 1825)
- 1758 – Benedikt Schack, Czech tenor and composer (died 1826)
- 1796 – Thomas Gregson, English-Australian lawyer and politician, 2nd Premier of Tasmania (baptism date; (died 1874)
- 1802 – Louisa Jane Hall, American poet, essayist, and literary critic (died 1892)
- 1804 – John Deere, American blacksmith and businessman, founded Deere & Company (died 1886)
- 1812 – Charles Dickens, English novelist and critic (died 1870)
- 1825 – Karl Möbius, German zoologist and ecologist (died 1908)
- 1834 – Alfred-Philibert Aldrophe, French architect (died 1895)
- 1837 – James Murray, Scottish lexicographer and philologist (died 1915)
- 1864 – Arthur Collins, American baritone singer (died 1933)
- 1867 – Laura Ingalls Wilder, American author (died 1957)
- 1870 – Alfred Adler, Austrian-Scottish psychologist and therapist (died 1937)
- 1871 – Wilhelm Stenhammar, Swedish pianist, composer, and conductor (died 1927)
- 1873 – Thomas Andrews, Irish shipbuilder and businessman, designed the RMS Titanic (died 1912)
- 1875 – Erkki Melartin, Finnish composer (died 1937)
- 1877 – G. H. Hardy, English mathematician and geneticist (died 1947)
- 1878 – Ossip Gabrilowitsch, Russian-American pianist and conductor (died 1936)
- 1885 – Sinclair Lewis, American novelist, short-story writer, and playwright, Nobel Prize laureate (died 1951)
- 1885 – Hugo Sperrle, German field marshal (died 1953)
- 1887 – Eubie Blake, American pianist and composer (died 1983)
- 1887 – Peter Arshinov, Russian anarchist revolutionary (disappeared 1940)
- 1889 – Harry Nyquist, Swedish-American engineer and theorist (died 1976)
- 1893 – Joseph Algernon Pearce, Canadian astrophysicist and astronomer (died 1988)
- 1893 – Nicanor Abelardo, Filipino pianist, composer and teacher (died 1934)
- 1895 – Anita Stewart, American actress (died 1961)

=== 1901–present ===
- 1901 – Arnold Nordmeyer, New Zealand minister and politician, 30th New Zealand Minister of Finance (died 1989)
- 1904 – Ernest E. Debs, American politician (died 2002)
- 1905 – Paul Nizan, French philosopher and author (died 1940)
- 1905 – Ulf von Euler, Swedish physiologist and academic, Nobel Prize laureate (died 1983)
- 1906 – Oleg Antonov, Soviet engineer, founded the Antonov Design Bureau (died 1984)
- 1906 – Puyi, Chinese emperor (died 1967)
- 1908 – Buster Crabbe, American swimmer and actor (died 1983)
- 1908 – Manmath Nath Gupta, Indian journalist and author (died 2000)
- 1909 – Hélder Câmara, Brazilian archbishop (died 1999)
- 1909 – Amedeo Guillet, Italian soldier (died 2010)
- 1912 – Russell Drysdale, English-Australian painter (died 1981)
- 1912 – Roberta McCain, American socialite and oil heiress (died 2020)
- 1915 – Teoctist Arăpașu, Romanian patriarch (died 2007)
- 1915 – Eddie Bracken, American actor and singer (died 2002)
- 1916 – Frank Hyde, Australian rugby league player, coach, and sportscaster (died 2007)
- 1919 – Desmond Doss, American army corporal and combat medic, Medal of Honor recipient (died 2006)
- 1919 – Jock Mahoney, American actor and stuntman (died 1989)
- 1920 – Oscar Brand, Canadian-American singer-songwriter and author (died 2016)
- 1920 – An Wang, Chinese-American engineer and businessman, founded Wang Laboratories (died 1990)
- 1921 – Athol Rowan, South African cricketer (died 1998)
- 1922 – Hattie Jacques, English actress (died 1980)
- 1923 – Dora Bryan, English actress and restaurateur (died 2014)
- 1925 – Hans Schmidt, Canadian wrestler (died 2012)
- 1926 – Konstantin Feoktistov, Russian engineer and astronaut (died 2009)
- 1927 – Juliette Gréco, French singer and actress (died 2020)
- 1927 – Vladimir Kuts, Ukrainian-Russian runner and coach (died 1975)
- 1927 – Lalo Ríos, Mexican actor (died 1973)
- 1928 – Lincoln D. Faurer, American general (died 2014)
- 1929 – Jim Langley, English international footballer and manager (died 2007)
- 1932 – Gay Talese, American journalist and memoirist
- 1932 – Alfred Worden, American colonel, pilot, and astronaut (died 2020)
- 1933 – K. N. Choksy, Sri Lankan lawyer and politician, Sri Lankan Minister of Finance (died 2015)
- 1934 – Eddie Fenech Adami, Maltese lawyer and politician, 7th President of Malta
- 1934 – King Curtis, American saxophonist and producer (died 1971)
- 1934 – Earl King, American singer-songwriter, guitarist, and producer (died 2003)
- 1935 – Cliff Jones, Welsh international footballer
- 1935 – Herb Kohl, American businessman and politician (died 2023)
- 1935 – Jörg Schneider, Swiss actor and author (died 2015)
- 1936 – Jas Gawronski, Italian journalist and politician
- 1937 – Peter Jay, English economist, journalist, and diplomat, British Ambassador to the United States (died 2024)
- 1937 – Juan Pizarro, Puerto Rican baseball player (died 2021)
- 1940 – Tony Tan, Singaporean academic and politician, 7th President of Singapore
- 1942 – Gareth Hunt, English actor (died 2007)
- 1943 – Eric Foner, American historian, author, and academic
- 1945 – Gerald Davies, Welsh rugby player and journalist
- 1946 – Héctor Babenco, Argentinian-Brazilian director, producer, and screenwriter (died 2016)
- 1946 – Gérard Jean-Juste, Haitian priest and activist (died 2009)
- 1946 – Pete Postlethwaite, English actor (died 2011)
- 1946 – Cepillín, Mexican clown (died 2021)
- 1949 – Jacques Duchesneau, Canadian police officer and politician
- 1949 – Alan Lancaster, English-Australian bass player singer and songwriter Status Quo (died 2022)
- 1950 – Karen Joy Fowler, American author
- 1953 – Robert Brazile, American football player
- 1954 – Dieter Bohlen, German singer-songwriter and producer
- 1955 – Rolf Benirschke, American football player and game show host
- 1955 – Miguel Ferrer, American actor and director (died 2017)
- 1956 – John Nielsen, Danish racing driver
- 1956 – Mark St. John, American guitarist (died 2007)
- 1957 – Dámaso García, Dominican baseball player and footballer (died 2020)
- 1958 – Giuseppe Baresi, Italian footballer and manager
- 1958 – Terry Marsh, English boxer and politician
- 1958 – Matt Ridley, English journalist, author, and politician
- 1959 – Mick McCarthy, English footballer, manager, and sportscaster
- 1960 – Robert Smigel, American actor, producer, and screenwriter
- 1960 – James Spader, American actor and producer
- 1962 – Garth Brooks, American singer-songwriter and guitarist
- 1962 – David Bryan, American keyboard player and songwriter
- 1962 – Eddie Izzard, English comedian, actor, and producer
- 1963 – Heidemarie Stefanyshyn-Piper, American Naval officer and astronaut
- 1964 – Ashok Banker, Indian journalist, author, and screenwriter
- 1965 – Chris Rock, American actor, director, producer, and screenwriter
- 1966 – Kristin Otto, German swimmer
- 1968 – Peter Bondra, Ukrainian-Slovak ice hockey player and manager
- 1968 – Christian Drobits, Austrian politician
- 1968 – Sully Erna, American singer-songwriter and musician
- 1968 – Mark Tewksbury, Canadian swimmer and sportscaster
- 1969 – Franz Jantscher, Austrian politician
- 1969 – Andrew Micallef, Maltese painter and musician
- 1971 – Anita Tsoy, Russian singer-songwriter
- 1972 – Essence Atkins, American actress
- 1972 – Robyn Lively, American actress
- 1973 – Juwan Howard, American basketball player and coach
- 1974 – J Dilla, American rapper and producer (died 2006)
- 1974 – Steve Nash, South African-Canadian basketball player
- 1974 – Nujabes, Japanese record producer, DJ, composer and arranger (died 2010)
- 1975 – Wes Borland, American singer-songwriter and guitarist
- 1975 – Miriam Corowa, Australian journalist, television presenter and producer
- 1975 – Alexandre Daigle, Canadian ice hockey player
- 1975 – Rémi Gaillard, French comedian and actor
- 1976 – Chito Miranda, Filipino singer-songwriter
- 1977 – Tsuneyasu Miyamoto, Japanese footballer
- 1978 – David Aebischer, Swiss ice hockey player
- 1978 – Endy Chávez, Venezuelan baseball player
- 1978 – Ashton Kutcher, American model, actor, producer, and entrepreneur
- 1978 – Milt Palacio, American-Belizean basketball player and coach
- 1978 – Daniel Van Buyten, Belgian footballer
- 1979 – Daniel Bierofka, German footballer and coach
- 1979 – Tawakkol Karman, Yemeni journalist and activist, Nobel Prize laureate
- 1979 – Sam J. Miller, American author
- 1980 – Dalibor Bagarić, Croatian basketball player
- 1980 – Mikey Erg, American drummer, guitarist, and vocalist
- 1981 – Neto, Brazilian footballer
- 1981 – Lee Ok-sung, South Korean boxer
- 1982 – Mohammed Bijeh, Iranian serial killer (died 2006)
- 1982 – Osamu Mukai, Japanese actor
- 1982 – Mickaël Piétrus, French basketball player
- 1983 – Scott Feldman, American baseball player
- 1983 – Federico Marchetti, Italian footballer
- 1984 – Trey Hardee, American decathlete
- 1984 – Jeremy Meeks, American model and actor
- 1985 – Josh Hennessy, American ice hockey player
- 1985 – Bernard James, American basketball player
- 1985 – Tina Majorino, American actress
- 1985 – Deborah Ann Woll, American actress
- 1987 – Joel Freeland, English basketball player
- 1988 – Ai Kago, Japanese singer and actress
- 1988 – Matthew Stafford, American football player
- 1989 – Nick Calathes, American-Greek basketball player
- 1989 – Isaiah Thomas, American basketball player
- 1989 – Elia Viviani, Italian cyclist
- 1990 – Morris Claiborne, American football player
- 1990 – Jacksepticeye, Irish YouTuber
- 1990 – Gianluca Lapadula, Italian footballer
- 1990 – Dalilah Muhammad, American hurdler
- 1990 – Steven Stamkos, Canadian ice hockey player
- 1991 – Gabbie Hanna, American Internet personality and singer-songwriter
- 1991 – Ryan O'Reilly, Canadian ice hockey player
- 1991 – Richard Pánik, Slovak ice hockey player
- 1992 – Sergi Roberto, Spanish footballer
- 1992 – Ksenia Stolbova, Russian figure skater
- 1992 – Maimi Yajima, Japanese singer and actress
- 1993 – Javon Hargrave, American football player
- 1993 – Chris Mears, English diver
- 1994 – Riley Barber, American ice hockey player
- 1994 – Nathan Walker, Welsh-Australian ice hockey player
- 1995 – Tom Glynn-Carney, English actor and musician
- 1995 – Roberto Osuna, Mexican baseball player
- 1996 – Aaron Ekblad, Canadian ice hockey player
- 1996 – Pierre Gasly, French racing driver
- 1997 – Nicolò Barella, Italian footballer
- 1997 – Anhelina Kalinina, Ukrainian tennis player
- 1999 – Omar Marmoush, Egyptian footballer
- 2000 – Jayden Campbell, Australian rugby league player
- 2001 – R. J. Hampton, American basketball player
- 2002 – Shedeur Sanders, American football player
- 2003 – Alessandro Fontanarosa, Italian footballer
- 2007 – Diego Aguado, Spanish footballer

== Deaths ==
=== Pre-1600 ===
- 199 – Lü Bu, Chinese warlord
- 318 – Jin Mindi, emperor of the Jin Dynasty (born 300)
- 999 – Boleslaus II the Pious, Duke of Bohemia (born 932)
- 1045 – Emperor Go-Suzaku of Japan (born 1009)
- 1065 – Siegfried I, Count of Sponheim (born c. 1010)
- 1127 – Ava, German poet (born 1060)
- 1165 – Marshal Stephen of Armenia
- 1259 – Thomas, Count of Flanders
- 1317 – Robert, Count of Clermont (born 1256)
- 1320 – Jan Muskata, Bishop of Kraków (born 1250)
- 1333 – Nikko, Japanese priest, founder of Nichiren Shoshu Buddhism (born 1246)
- 1520 – Alfonsina de' Medici, Regent of Florence (born 1472)
- 1560 – Bartolommeo Bandinelli, Florentine sculptor (born 1493)

=== 1601–1900 ===
- 1603 – Bartholomäus Sastrow, German politician (born 1520)
- 1623 – Thomas Cecil, 1st Earl of Exeter, English soldier and politician, Lord Lieutenant of Northamptonshire (born 1546)
- 1626 – William V, Duke of Bavaria (born 1548)
- 1642 – William Bedell, English bishop and academic (born 1571)
- 1693 – Paul Pellisson, French lawyer and author (born 1624)
- 1736 – Stephen Gray, English astronomer and physicist (born 1666)
- 1779 – William Boyce, English organist and composer (born 1711)
- 1799 – Qianlong Emperor of China (born 1711)
- 1801 – Daniel Chodowiecki, Polish-German painter and academic (born 1726)
- 1819 – August Wilhelm Hupel, German-Estonian linguist and author (born 1737)
- 1823 – Ann Radcliffe, English author (born 1764)
- 1837 – Gustav IV Adolf of Sweden (born 1778)
- 1849 – Mariano Paredes, Mexican general and 16th president (1845–1846) (born 1797)
- 1862 – Francisco de Paula Martínez de la Rosa y Berdejo, Spanish playwright and politician, Prime Minister of Spain (born 1787)
- 1864 – Vuk Karadžić, Serbian philologist and linguist (born 1787)
- 1871 – Henry E. Steinway, German-American businessman, founded Steinway & Sons (born 1797)
- 1873 – Sheridan Le Fanu, Irish author (born 1814)
- 1878 – Pope Pius IX (born 1792)
- 1891 – Marie Louise Andrews, American story writer and journalist (born 1849)
- 1897 – Galileo Ferraris, Italian physicist and engineer (born 1847)

=== 1901–present ===
- 1919 – William Halford, English-American lieutenant, Medal of Honor recipient (born 1841)
- 1920 – Alexander Kolchak, Russian admiral and explorer (born 1874)
- 1920 – Charles Langelier, Canadian journalist, judge, and politician (born 1850)
- 1921 – John J. Gardner, American politician (born 1845)
- 1937 – Elihu Root, American lawyer and politician, 38th United States Secretary of State, Nobel Prize laureate (born 1845)
- 1938 – Harvey Samuel Firestone, American businessman, founded the Firestone Tire and Rubber Company (born 1868)
- 1939 – Boris Grigoriev, Russian painter and illustrator (born 1886)
- 1940 – James McCormick (Irish republican), Executed Irish Republican (born 1910)
- 1940 – Peter Barnes (Irish republican), Executed Irish Republican (born 1907)
- 1942 – Ivan Bilibin, Russian illustrator and stage designer (born 1876)
- 1944 – Lina Cavalieri, Italian soprano and actress (born 1874)
- 1959 – Nap Lajoie, American baseball player and manager (born 1874)
- 1959 – Daniel François Malan, South African minister and politician, 5th Prime Minister of South Africa (born 1874)
- 1959 – Guitar Slim, American singer and guitarist (born 1926)
- 1960 – Igor Kurchatov, Russian physicist and academic (born 1903)
- 1963 – Learco Guerra, Italian cyclist and manager (born 1902)
- 1964 – Sofoklis Venizelos, Greek captain and politician, 133rd Prime Minister of Greece (born 1894)
- 1968 – Nick Adams, American actor and screenwriter (born 1931)
- 1972 – Walter Lang, American director and screenwriter (born 1896)
- 1979 – Josef Mengele, German SS officer and physician (born 1911)
- 1986 – Cheikh Anta Diop, Senegalese historian, anthropologist, and physicist (born 1923)
- 1990 – Alan Perlis, American computer scientist and academic (born 1922)
- 1990 – Alfredo M. Santos, Filipino general (born 1905)
- 1991 – Amos Yarkoni, Israeli colonel (born 1920)
- 1994 – Witold Lutosławski, Polish composer and conductor (born 1913)
- 1999 – King Hussein of Jordan (born 1935)
- 1999 – Bobby Troup, American actor, pianist, and composer (born 1918)
- 2000 – Doug Henning, Canadian magician and politician (born 1947)
- 2001 – Anne Morrow Lindbergh, American author and pilot (born 1906)
- 2003 – Augusto Monterroso, Guatemalan author (born 1921)
- 2005 – Atli Dam, Faroese engineer and politician, 5th Prime Minister of the Faroe Islands (born 1932)
- 2006 – Princess Durru Shehvar of the Ottoman Empire (born 1914)
- 2009 – Blossom Dearie, American singer and pianist (born 1924)
- 2010 – Franco Ballerini, Italian cyclist and coach (born 1964)
- 2012 – Harry Keough, American soccer player and coach (born 1927)
- 2013 – Krsto Papić, Croatian director and screenwriter (born 1933)
- 2014 – Doug Mohns, Canadian-American ice hockey player (born 1933)
- 2015 – Billy Casper, American golfer (born 1931)
- 2015 – Marshall Rosenberg, American psychologist and author (born 1934)
- 2015 – Dean Smith, American basketball player and coach (born 1931)
- 2015 – John C. Whitehead, American banker and politician, 9th United States Deputy Secretary of State (born 1922)
- 2017 – Richard Hatch, American actor (born 1945)
- 2017 – Hans Rosling, Swedish academic (born 1948)
- 2017 – Tzvetan Todorov, Bulgarian philosopher (born 1939)
- 2019 – John Dingell, American politician (born 1926)
- 2019 – Albert Finney, English actor (born 1936)
- 2019 – Jan Olszewski, Polish politician, 3rd Prime Minister (born 1930)
- 2019 – Frank Robinson, American baseball player, coach, and manager (born 1935)
- 2020 – Li Wenliang, Chinese ophthalmologist who initially warned about COVID-19 (born 1985)
- 2025 – Dafydd Elis-Thomas, Welsh academic and politician (born 1946)
- 2025 – Tony Roberts, American actor and singer (born 1939)

== Holidays and observances ==
- Christian feast day:
  - Richard the Pilgrim
  - Blessed Eugénie Smet
  - John of Triora
  - Luke of Steiris
  - Blessed Petro Verhun
  - Blessed Pope Pius IX
  - Rosalie Rendu
  - Egidio Maria of Saint Joseph
  - February 7 (Eastern Orthodox liturgics)
  - New Martyrs and Confessors of the Russian Orthodox Church Typically observed on the Sunday closest to January 25 (O.S.)/February 7 (N.S.)
- Independence Day (Grenada), celebrates the independence of Grenada from the United Kingdom in 1974.
- National Black HIV/AIDS Awareness Day (United States)
