= Jantscher =

Jantscher is a surname. Notable people with the surname include:

- Franz Jantscher (born 1969), Austrian politician
- Jakob Jantscher (born 1989), Austrian footballer
