= Hosios Loukas =

Monastery in Boeotia, Greece

Monastery of Hosios Loukas
UNESCO World Heritage Site
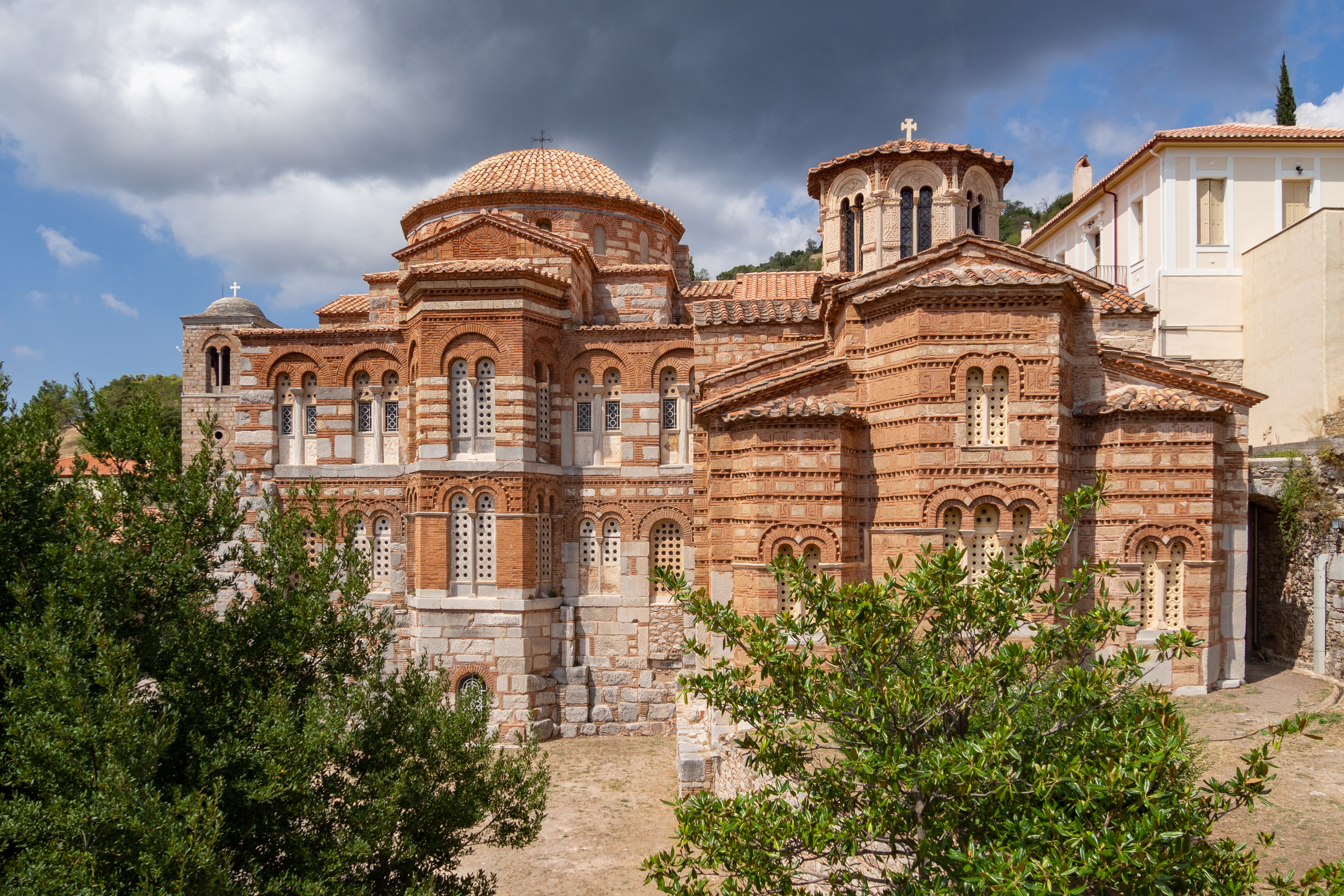

- Location within Greece
- Location: Distomo-Arachova-Antikyra Municipality, Boeotia, Central Greece, Greece
- Part of: Monasteries of Daphni, Hosios Loukas and Nea Moni of Chios
- Criteria: Cultural: (i)(iv)
- Reference: 537-001
- Inscription: 1990 (14th Session)
- Area: 1.43 ha (3.5 acres)
- Buffer zone: 5,443.31 ha (13,450.7 acres)
- Coordinates: 38°23′43.3″N 22°44′48.6″E

Hosios Loukas (Greek: Ὅσιος Λουκᾶς) is a historic walled monastery situated near the town of Distomo, in Boeotia, Greece. Founded in the mid-10th century, the monastery is one of the most important monuments of Middle Byzantine architecture and art, and has been listed on UNESCO's World Heritage Sites since 1990, along with the monasteries of Nea Moni and Daphnion.

== History ==
The monastery of Hosios Loukas is situated at a scenic site on the slopes of Mount Helicon. It was founded in the early 10th century AD by the hermit, Venerable (Greek: Hosios) Luke of Steiris (Greek: Lukas), whose relics are kept in the monastery to this day. St Luke (not to be confused with the Evangelist author of the Gospel of Saint Luke and the Acts of the Apostles), was a hermit who died on 7 February 953. He is famous for having predicted the conquest of Crete by Emperor Romanos. It was unclear if he was referring to Romanos I, the emperor at the time. However the island was actually reconquered by Nicephorus Phocas under Romanos II. It is believed that it was during the latter's reign (959–963) that the monastery's Church of the Theotokos (Panagia) was constructed.

The main shrine of the monastery is the tomb of St. Luke, originally situated in the vault, but later placed at the juncture of the two churches. The monastery derived its wealth (including funds required for construction) from the fact that the relics of St. Luke were said to have exuded myron, a sort of perfumed oil which produced healing miracles. Pilgrims hoping for miraculous help were encouraged to sleep by the side of the tomb in order to be healed by incubation. The mosaics around the tomb represent not only St. Luke himself, but also hegumen Philotheos offering a likeness of the newly built church to the saint.

The saint Nicholas the Pilgrim, a local shepherd, lived for some time in the second half of the eleventh century in the monastery until he was expelled due to his abnormal behaviour. Under the Latin Empire in 1206, the legate Benedict of Porto gave Hosios Loukas to the canons of the Holy Sepulchre.

== Architecture ==
=== The church ===
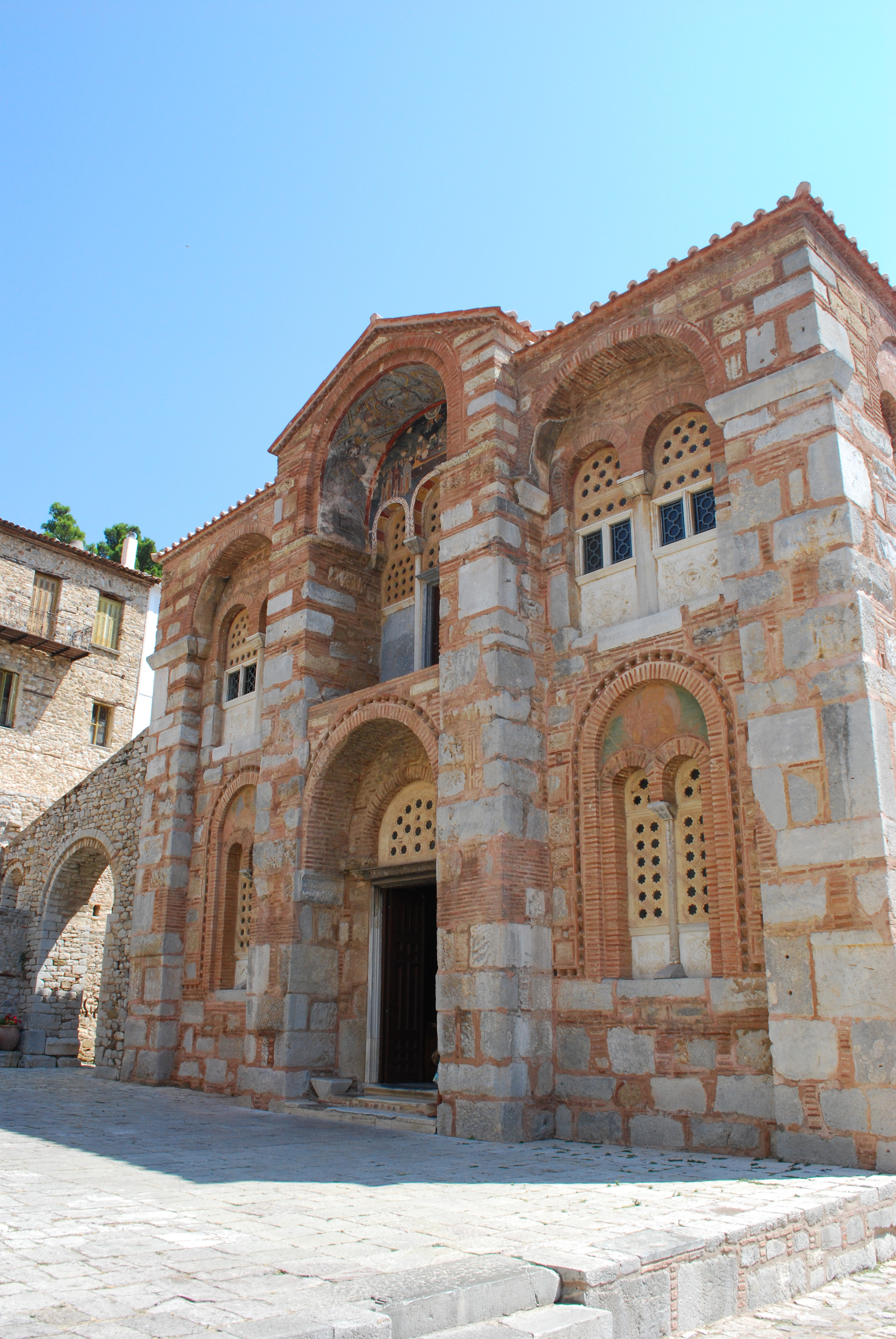
Exterior view

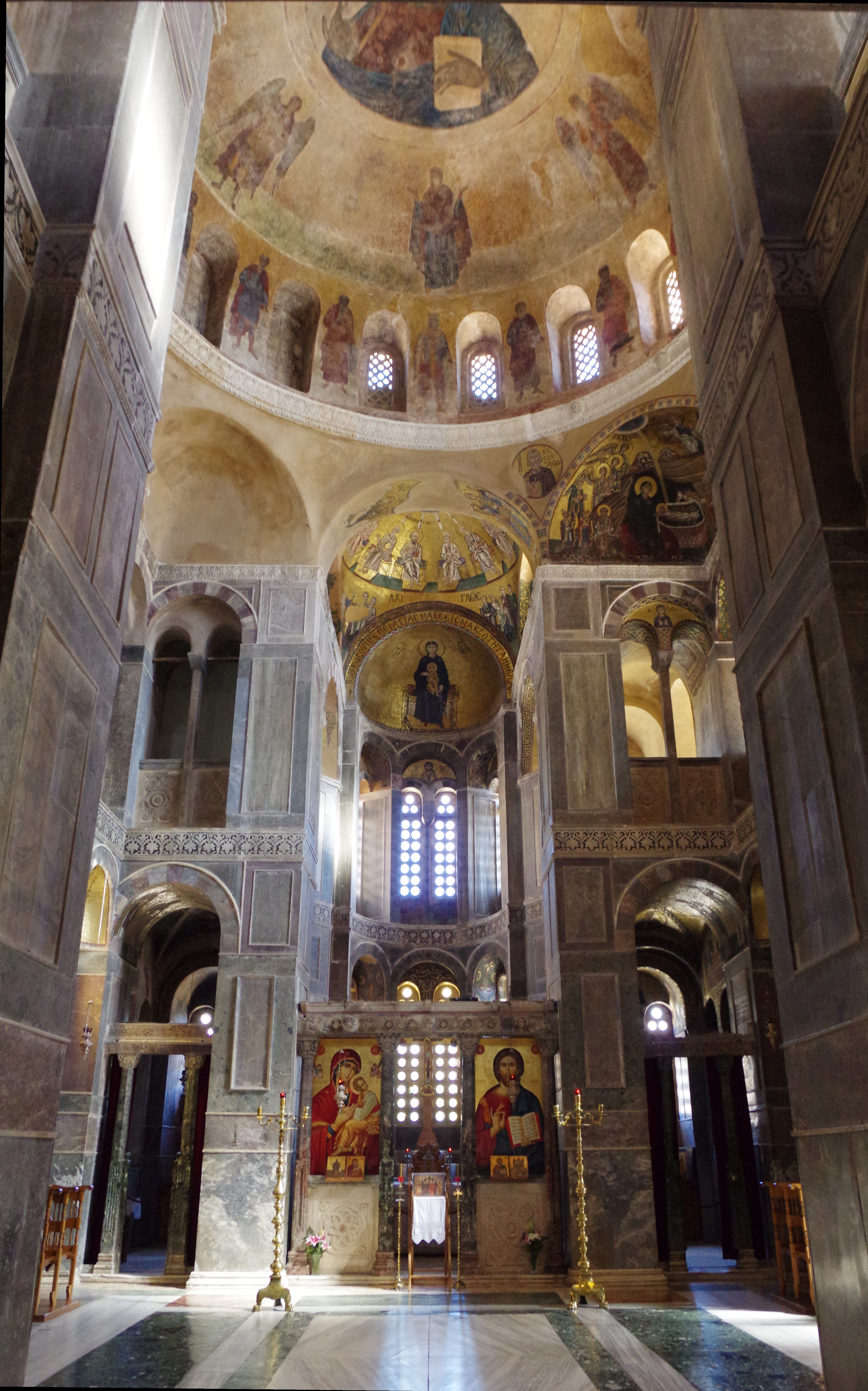
Interior

The Hosios Loukas, the oldest in the complex, is the only church known with certainty to have been built in the tenth century in its site in mainland Greece. This centralized parallelogram-shaped building is the oldest example of the cross-in-square type in the country; its plan closely follows that of Lips Monastery in Constantinople. The walls are opus mixtum (part brick, part stone, part marble) and display curious pseudo-kufic patterns.

The Hosios Loukas adjoins a larger cathedral church, or Katholikon, tentatively dated to 1011–12. The Katholikon is the earliest extant domed-octagon church, with eight piers arranged around the perimeter of the naos (nave). The hemispherical dome (without a drum) rests upon four squinches which make a transition from the octagonal base under the dome to the square defined by the walls below. The main cube of the church is surrounded by galleries and chapels on all four sides.

=== Decoration ===
Hosios Loukas is the largest of three monasteries surviving from the Middle Byzantine period in Greece. It differs from the Daphnion and Nea Moni in that it is dedicated to a single military saint. St. Lukes' prophecy about the reconquest of Crete is commemorated by the image of Joshua on the exterior wall of the Panagia church: Joshua was considered a model "warrior of the faith", whose help was especially effective in the wars waged against the Arabs. The Katholikon contains the best preserved complex of mosaics from the period of the Macedonian Renaissance. However, the complex is not complete: the original image of Christ Pantocrator inside the dome is missing, as are the figures of archangels normally placed between the upper windows.

There is evidence that the monastery was reputed all over Byzantium for its lavish decoration, liberally applied to all surfaces. Apart from revetment, carving, gold and silver plate, murals, and mosaics (especially imposing on curving surfaces), the interior featured a choice assortment of icons, chandeliers, silk curtains, and altar cloths. Only a fraction of these items are still in situ, most notably colored marble facings and window grilles. Notwithstanding the losses, the Katholikon "gives the best impression available anywhere today of the character of a church interior in the first centuries after the end of Iconoclasm".

=== The Burial Crypt ===
Beneath the great domed Katholikon is a burial crypt, accessible only by a stairwell on the southern side.

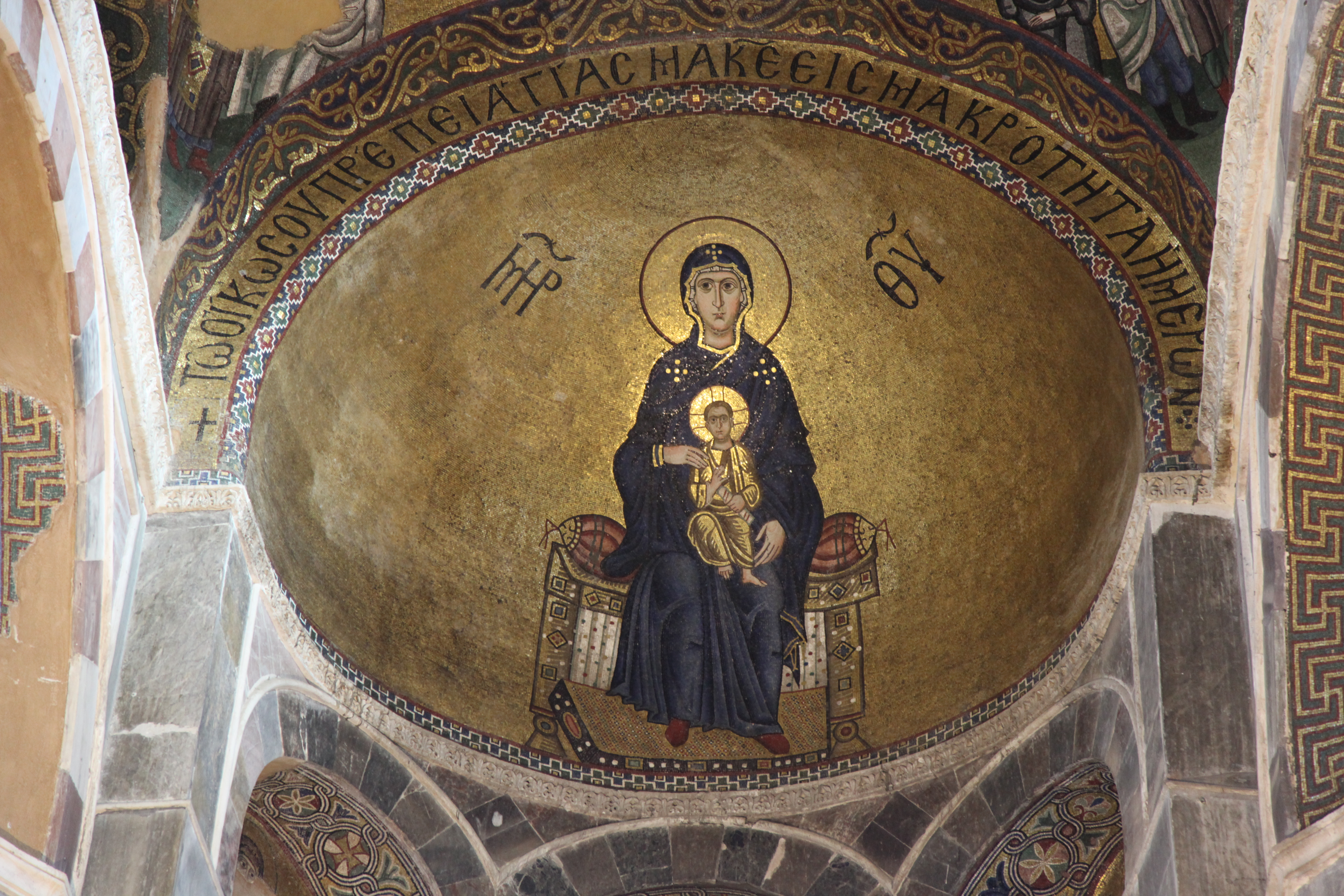
Virgin with Child mosaic

The crypt has three distinct areas: the entrance way; the main interior space which includes nine groin-vaulted bays and a sanctuary with a vaulted bay and an apse; and three vaulted passages, referred to formerly as bone vaults.

The crypt's frescoes were until recently covered in hundreds of years of dust and hidden but in the 1960s the crypt underwent a cleaning by the Greek Archaeological Service which revealed their remarkably well preserved state with the exceptions of the apse which has lost most of its plaster exposing brick and stone, as well as the entrance vault and groin vaults which have suffered slight damage from water seepage and minor vandalism, mostly on the lower lunettes near the entrance.

The crypt contains frescoes on the entryway and its vault, eight lunettes around the walls with depictions of Christ’s Passion and Resurrection, and forty medallion portraits of apostles, martyrs and holy men, abbots including Philotheos, as well as numerous inscriptions. C.L. Connor claims it has "the most complete programme of wall paintings surviving from the Middle Byzantine period."

It is believed that most if not all of the crypt frescoes were painted after 1048 AD and the death of Theodore Leobachus, a wealthy, government elite believed to have been one of the prominent patrons and who later in life became the abbot of Hosios Loukas.

The sanctuary of the crypt contains a prosthesis niche, an altar, and a chancel barrier which all indicate that the Eucharist was likely celebrated here as part of the services of burial and commemoration of revered religious figures, or as part of the ceremonies relating to the healing cult of Saint Luke.

When Hosios Loukas was frequented by pilgrims or members of Saint Luke’s healing cult, visitors would sleep not only in the Katholikon, but in the crypt itself where the tomb was kept along with two others, believed to be abbots. Saint Luke was believed to have been a miraculous healer, levitator, miraculous feeder and prophesier during his lifetime; after his death, all of the miracles associated with him involved the healing power of his tomb. Connor says that accounts in The Vita of St. Luke, written by an anonymous monk, indicate that “healing agents” associated with the tomb include but are not limited to exposure to “oil from the lamp above the tomb, moisture exuded from the tomb, and dreams experienced when sleeping near the tomb in the practice called incubation.” The tomb was frequented before and after the completion of the complex, but following completion it became the focal point of the miracle cult of Saint Luke. There is evidence that some wishing for miracles stayed for periods of up to six days near the tomb or in adjacent rooms.

== Gallery ==
Hosios Loukas

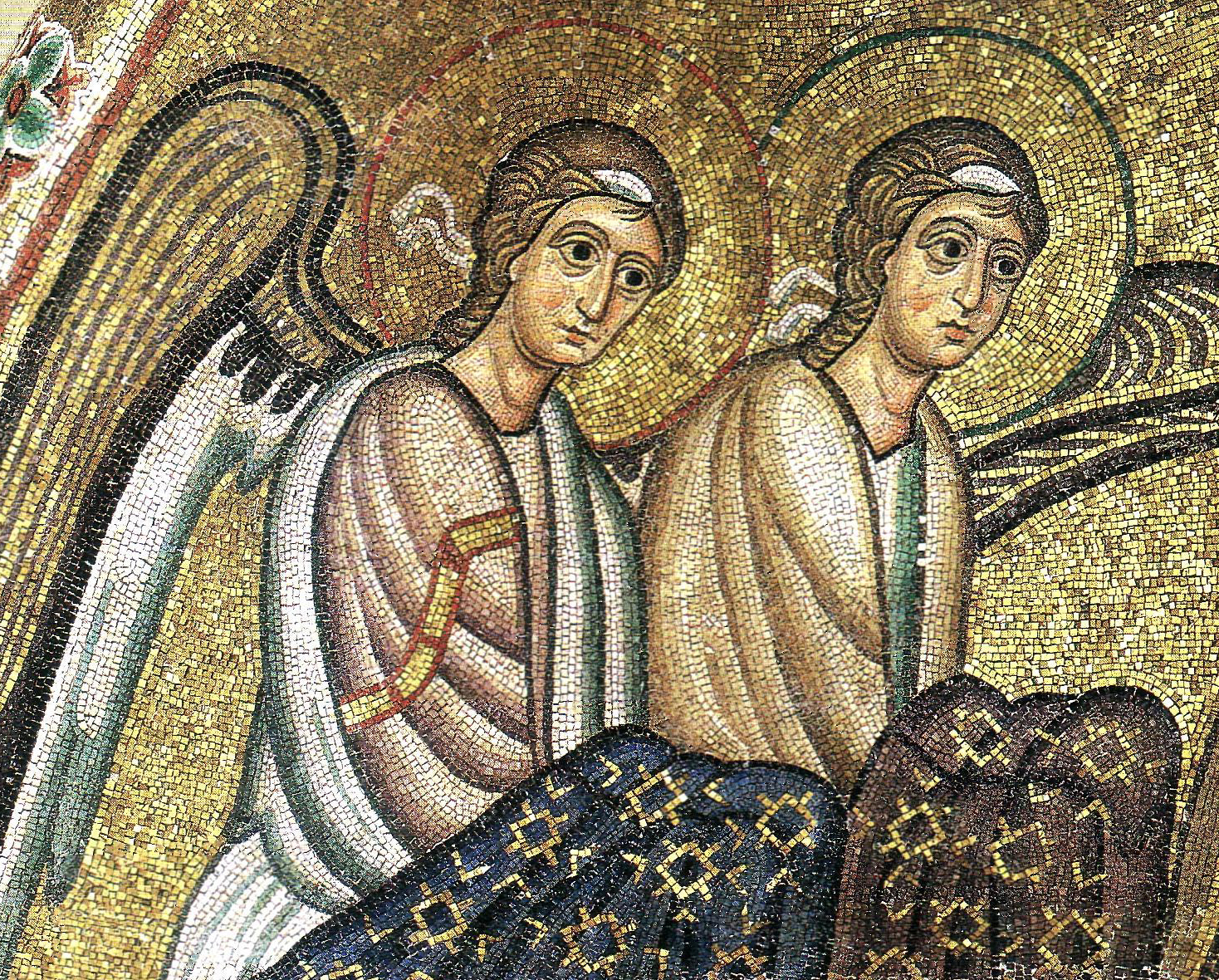
Interior mosaic with procession of angels

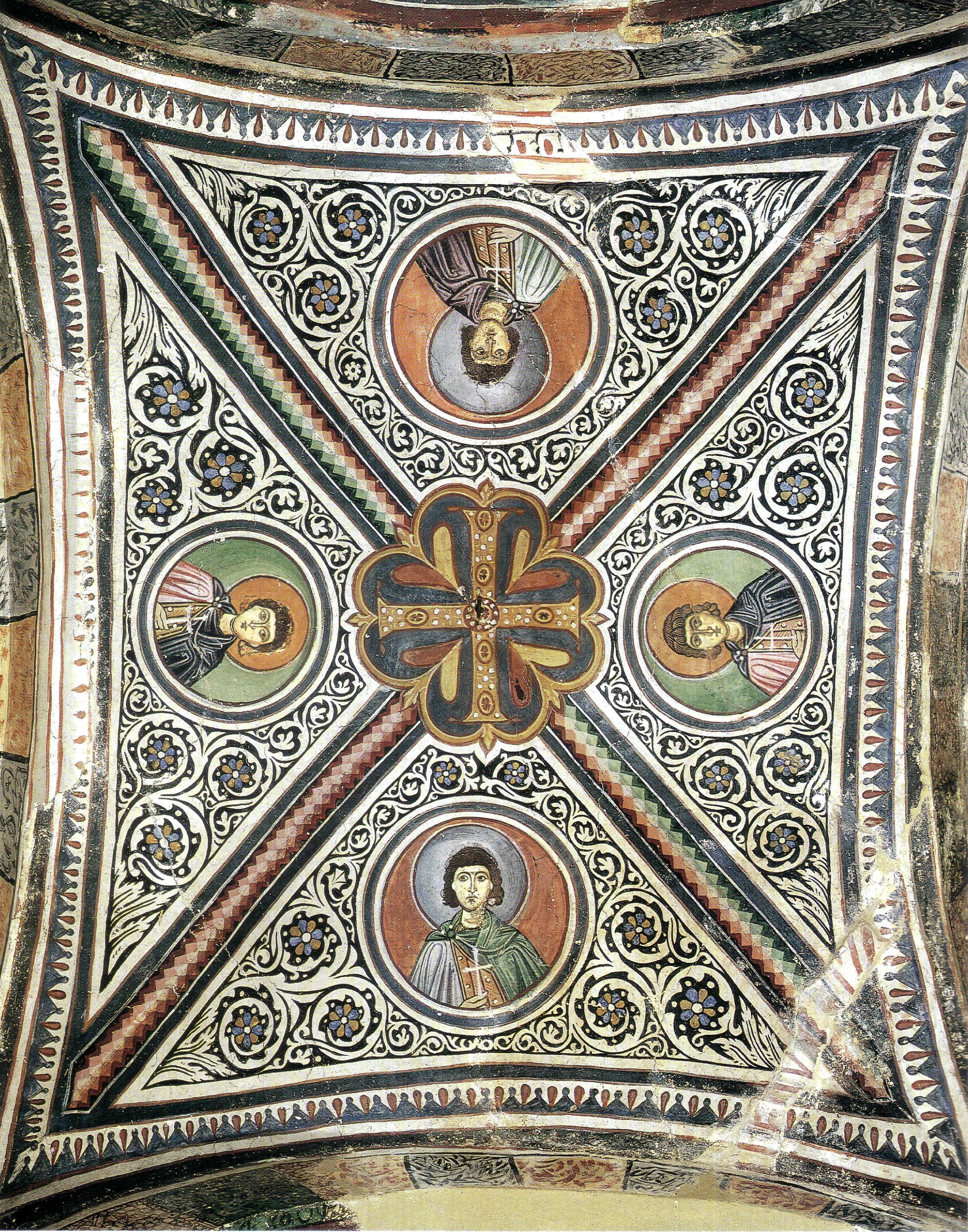
Fresco of the interior depicting martyrs

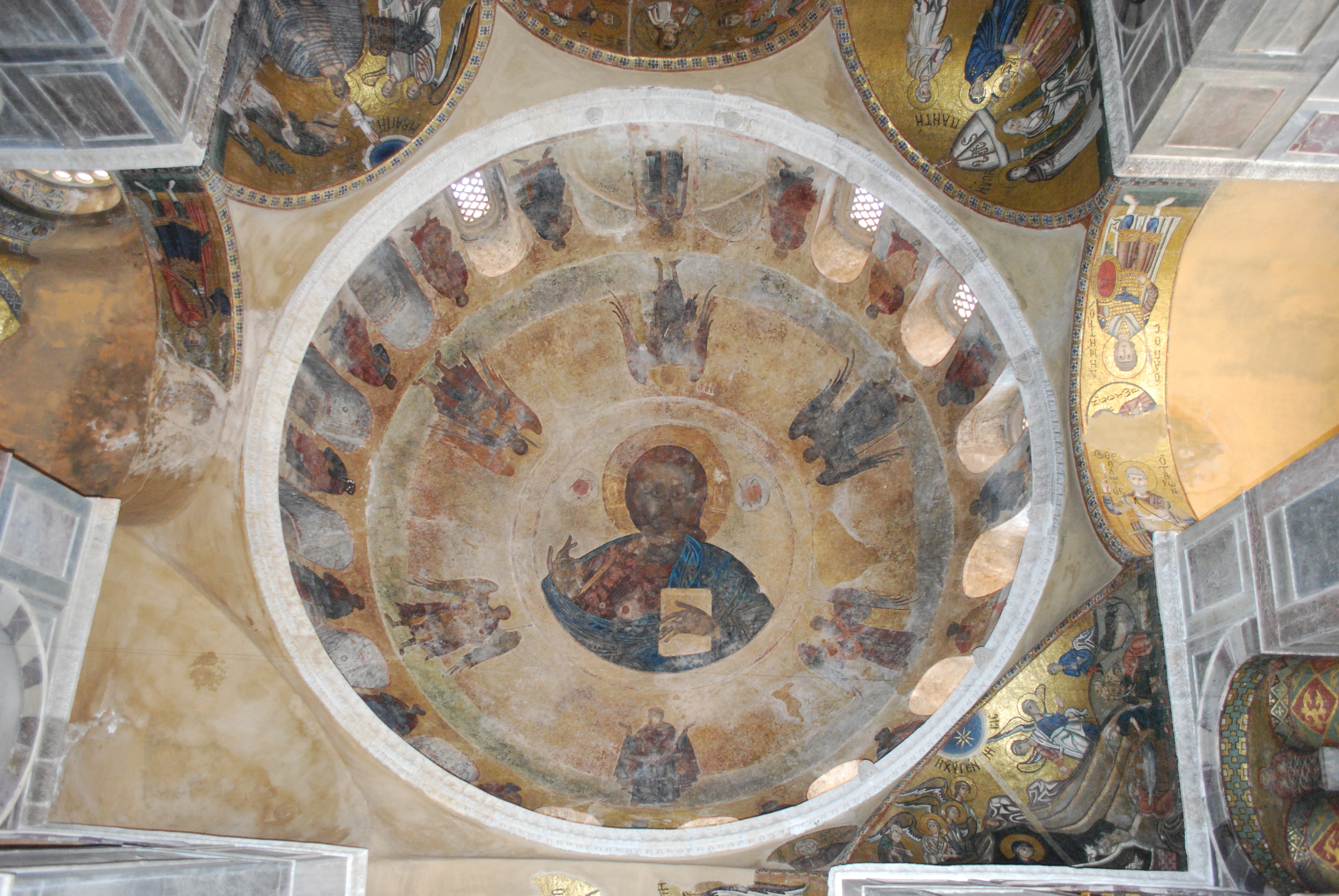
View of the dome

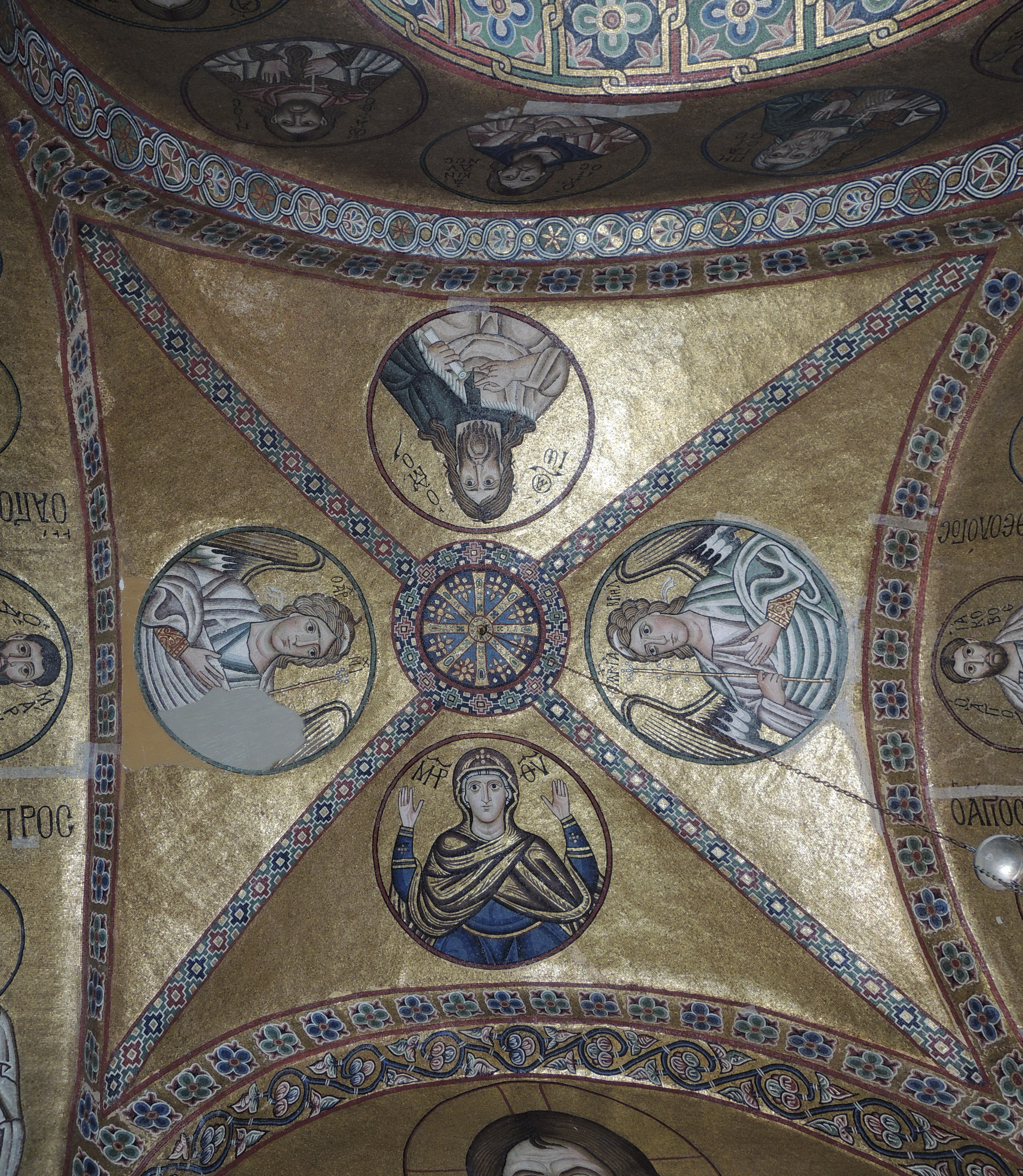
Clockwise:
St John, Archangel Gabriel, Virgin Mary, Archangel Michael
(narthex mosaic)

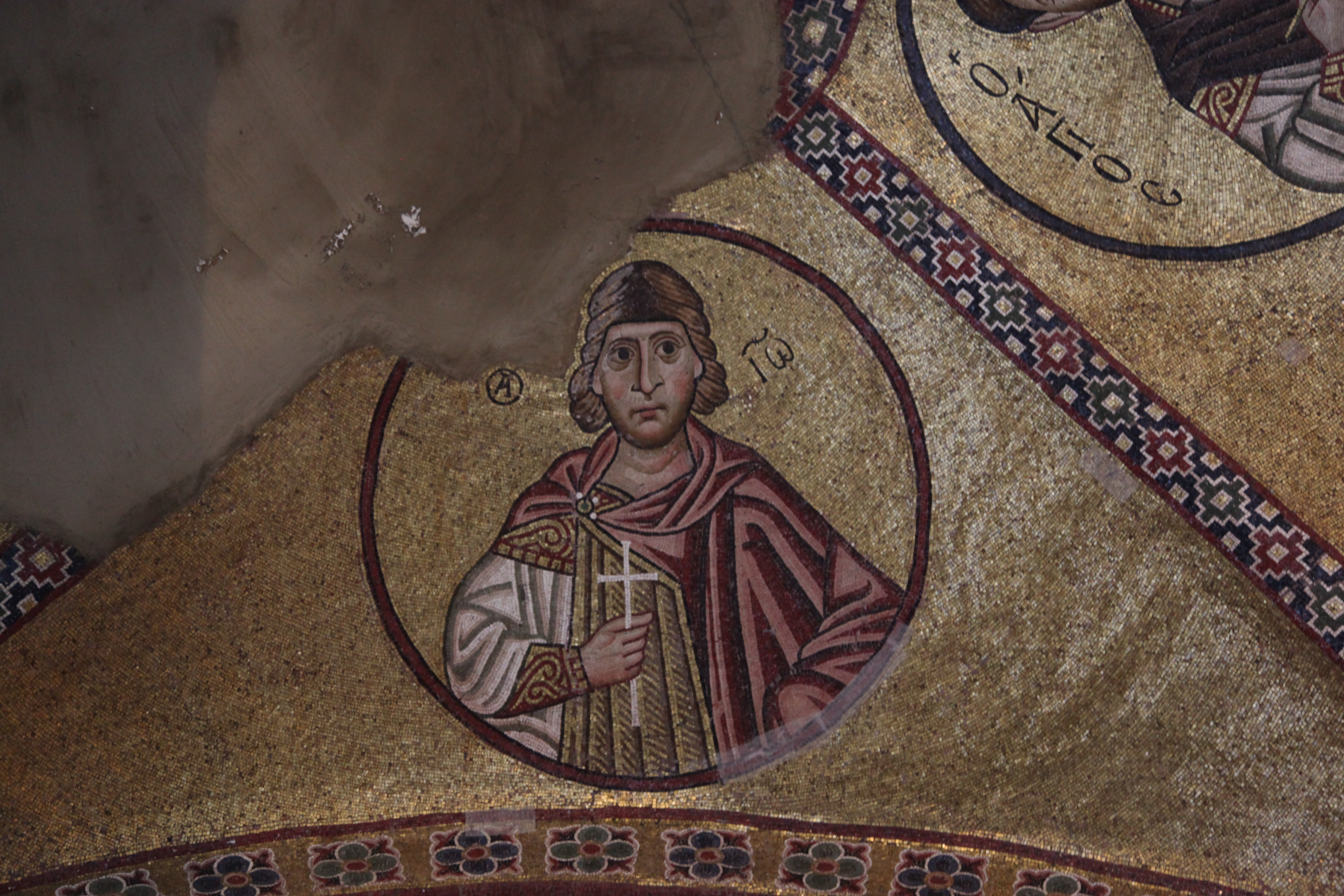
St John

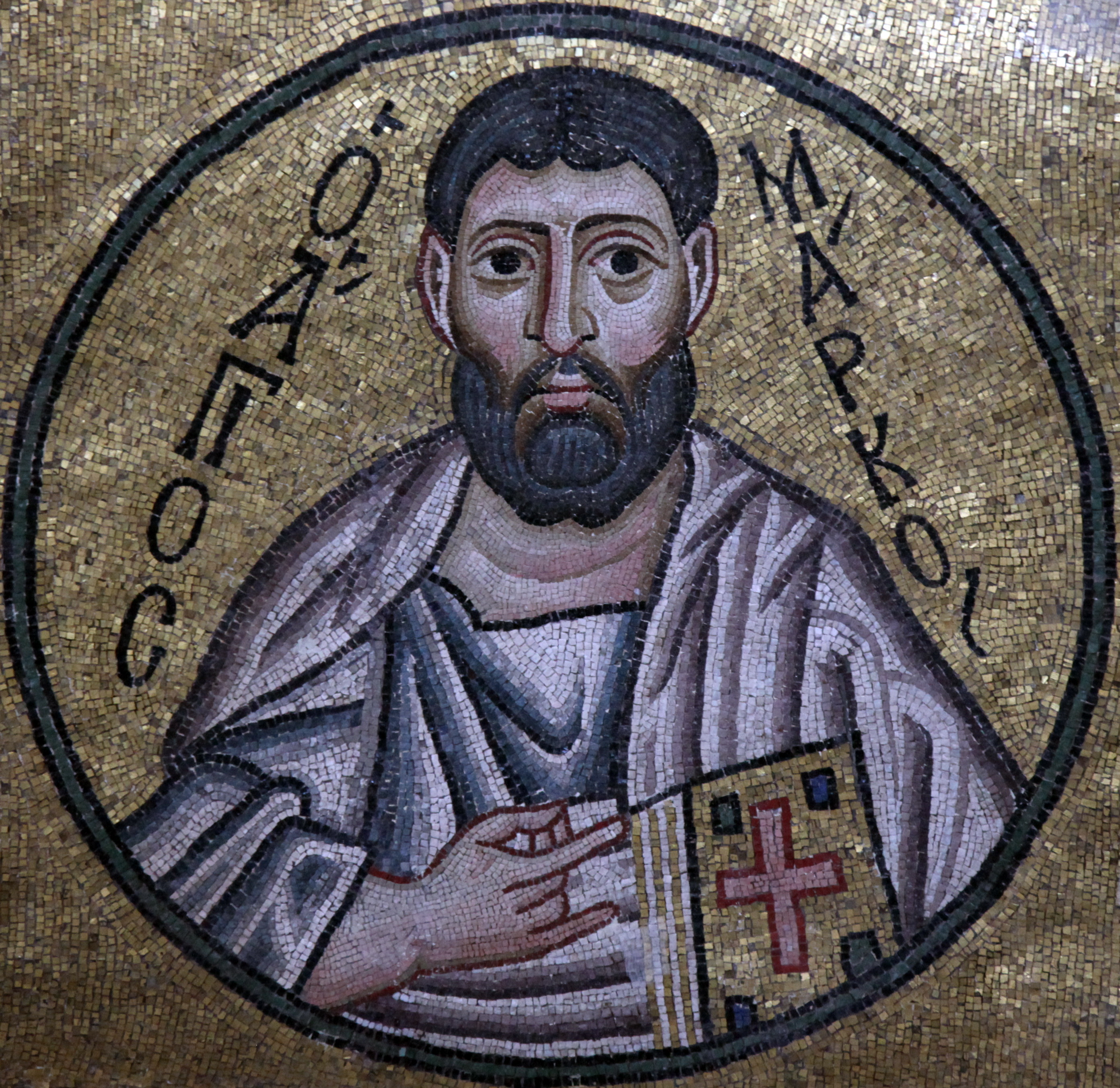
St Mark

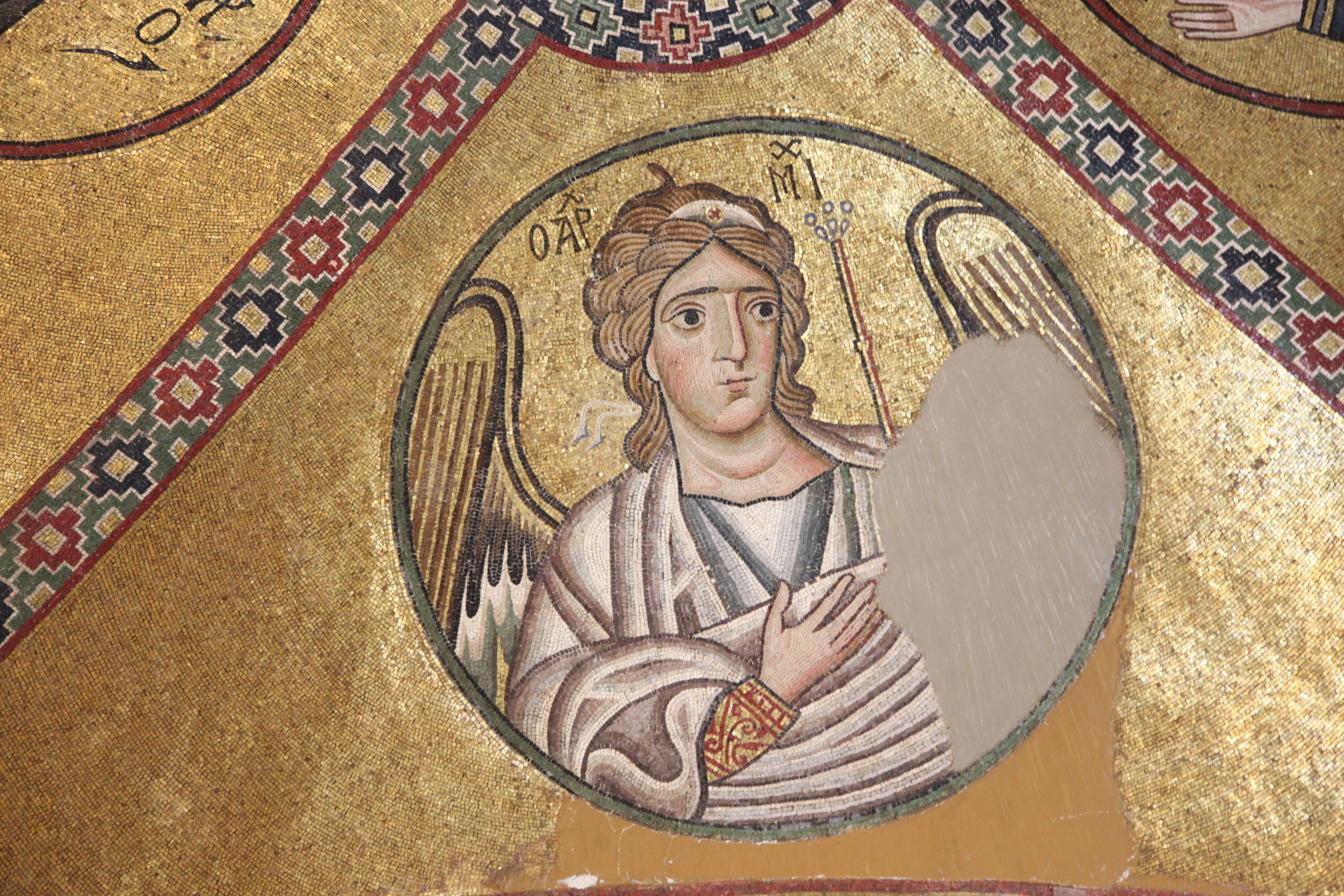
St Michael

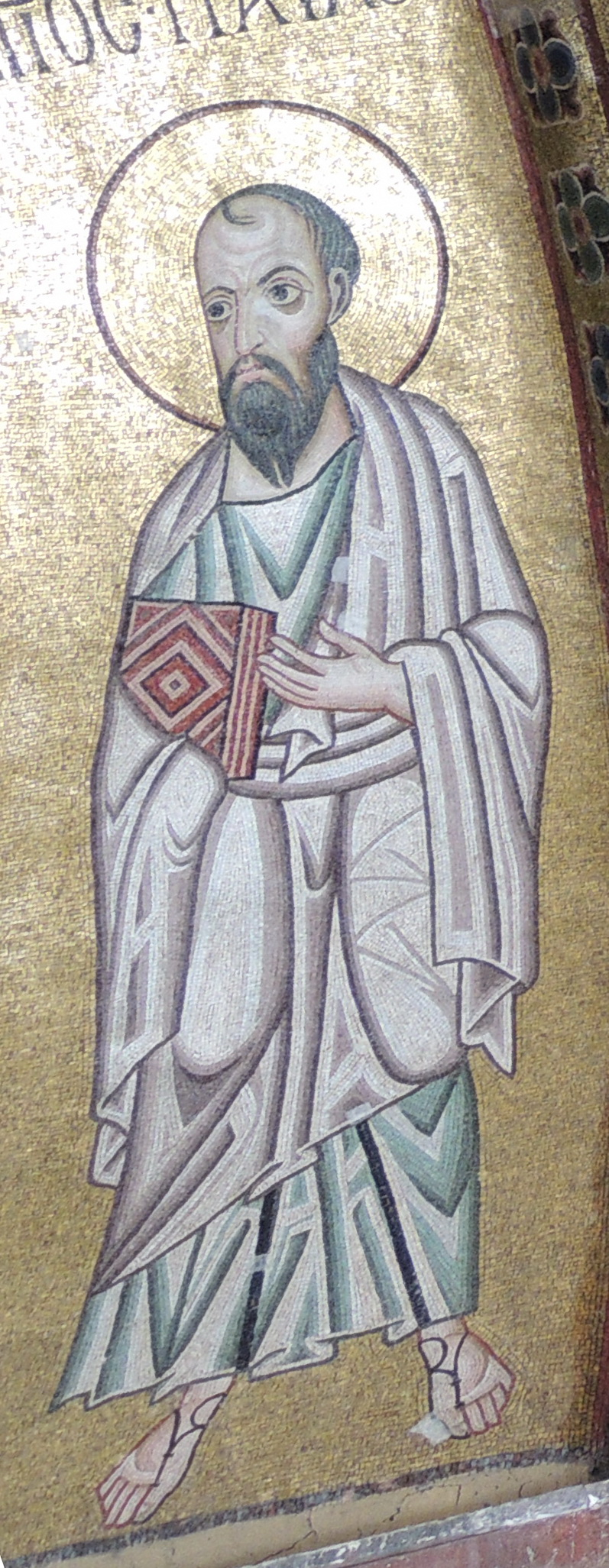
St Paul

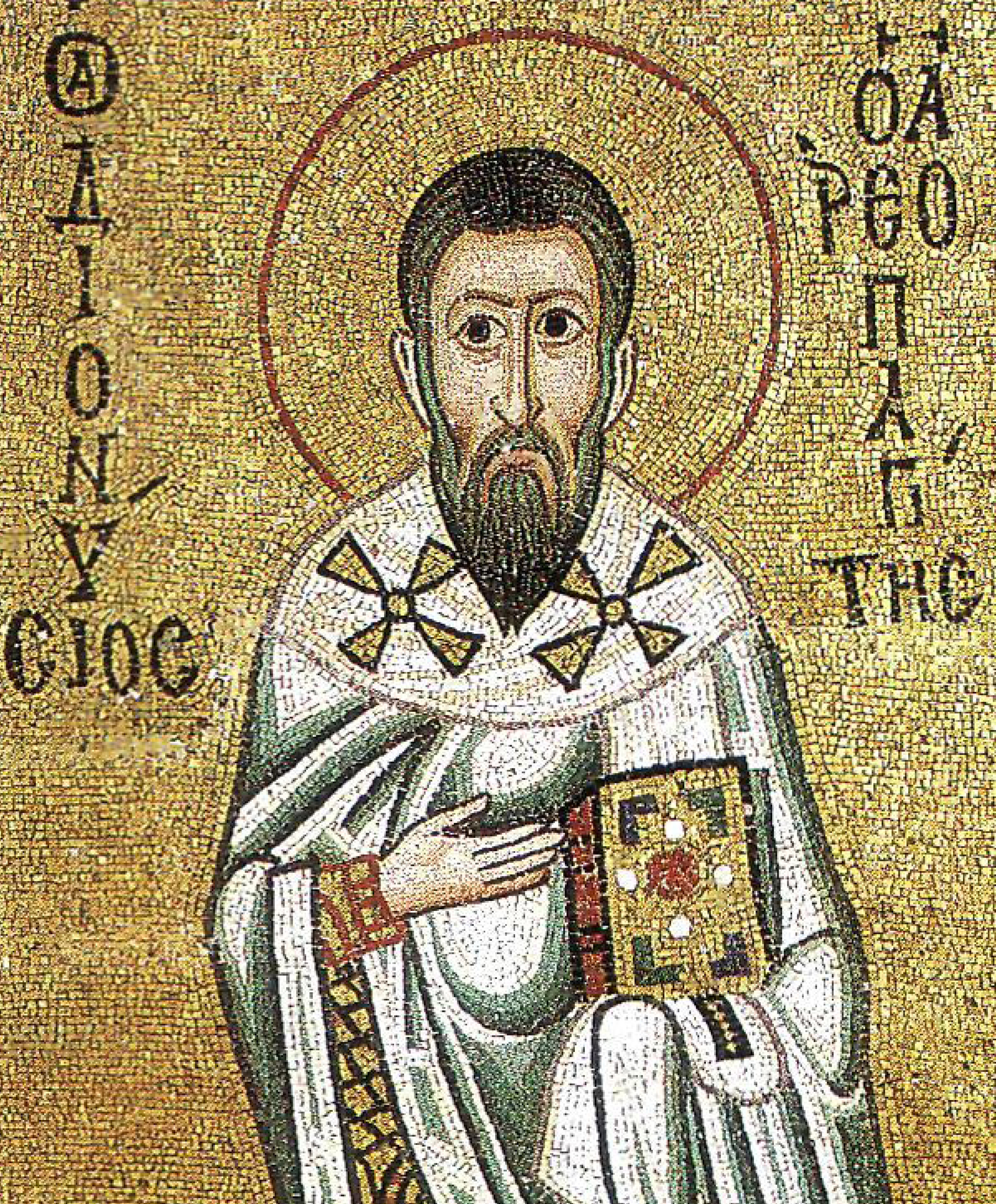
Dionysius the Areopagite

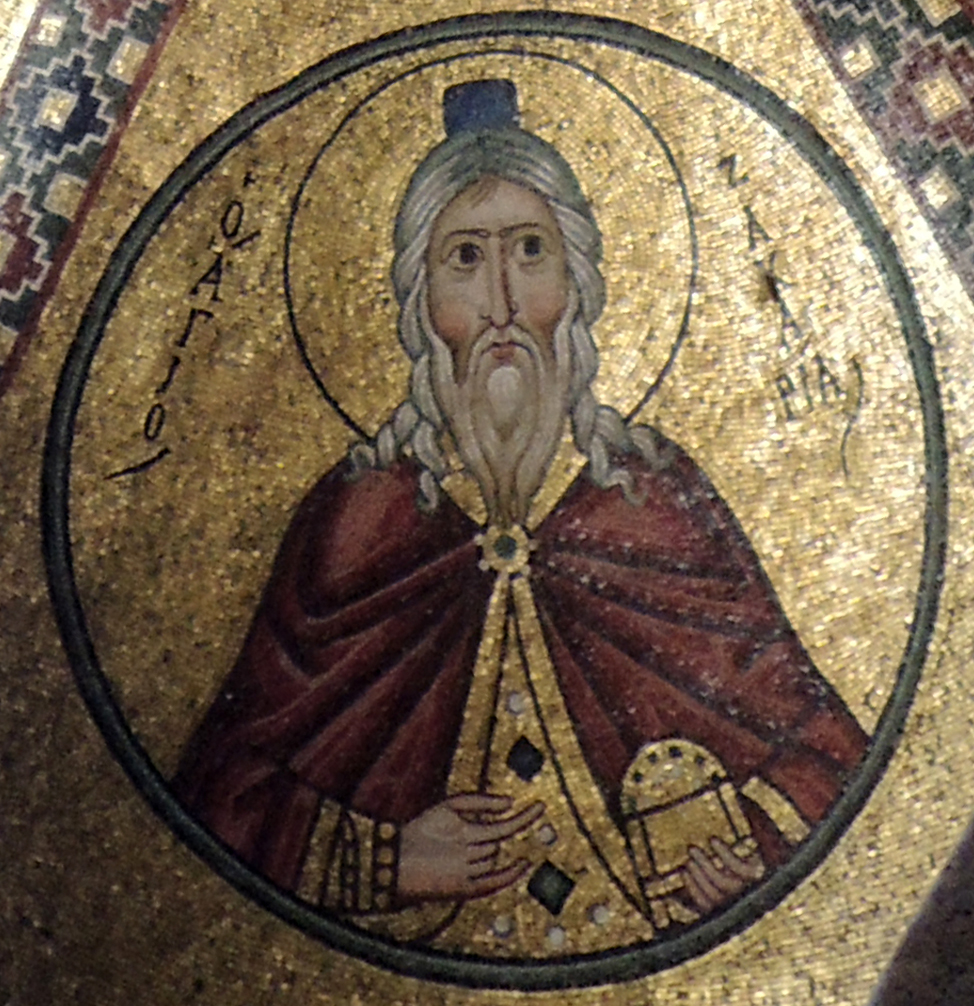
Zacharias

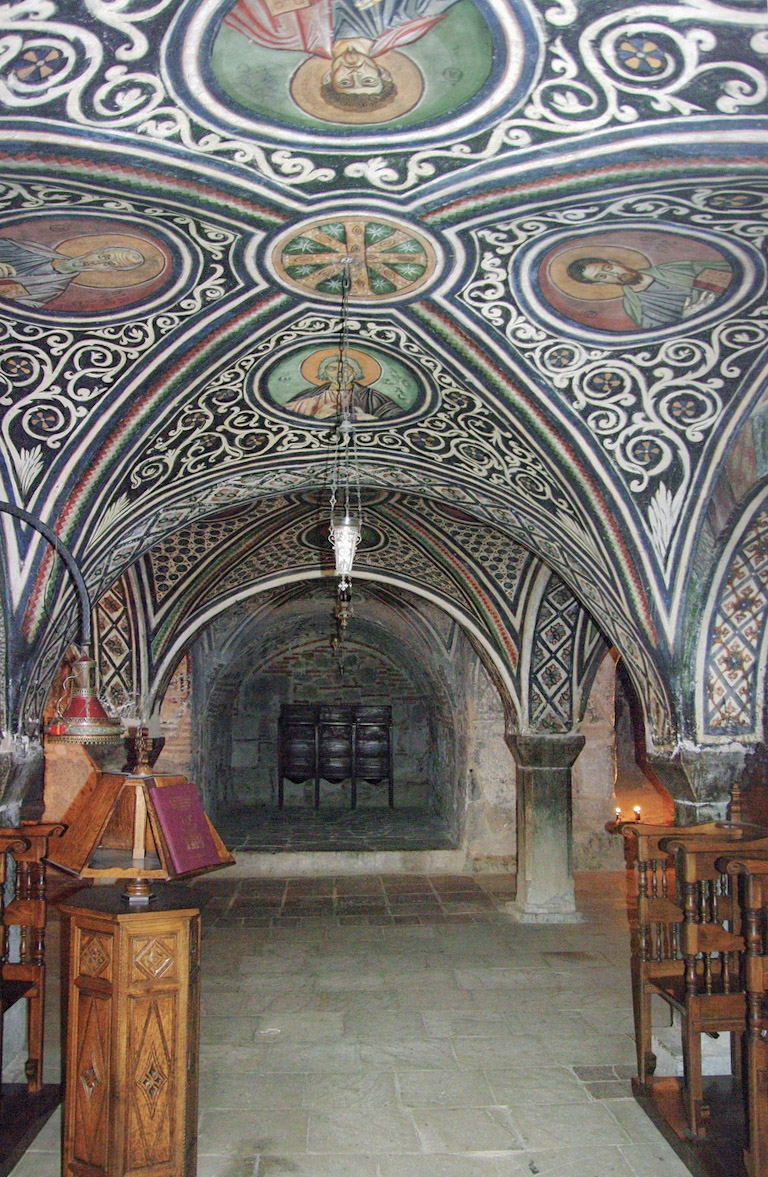
View of the lower church (crypt)

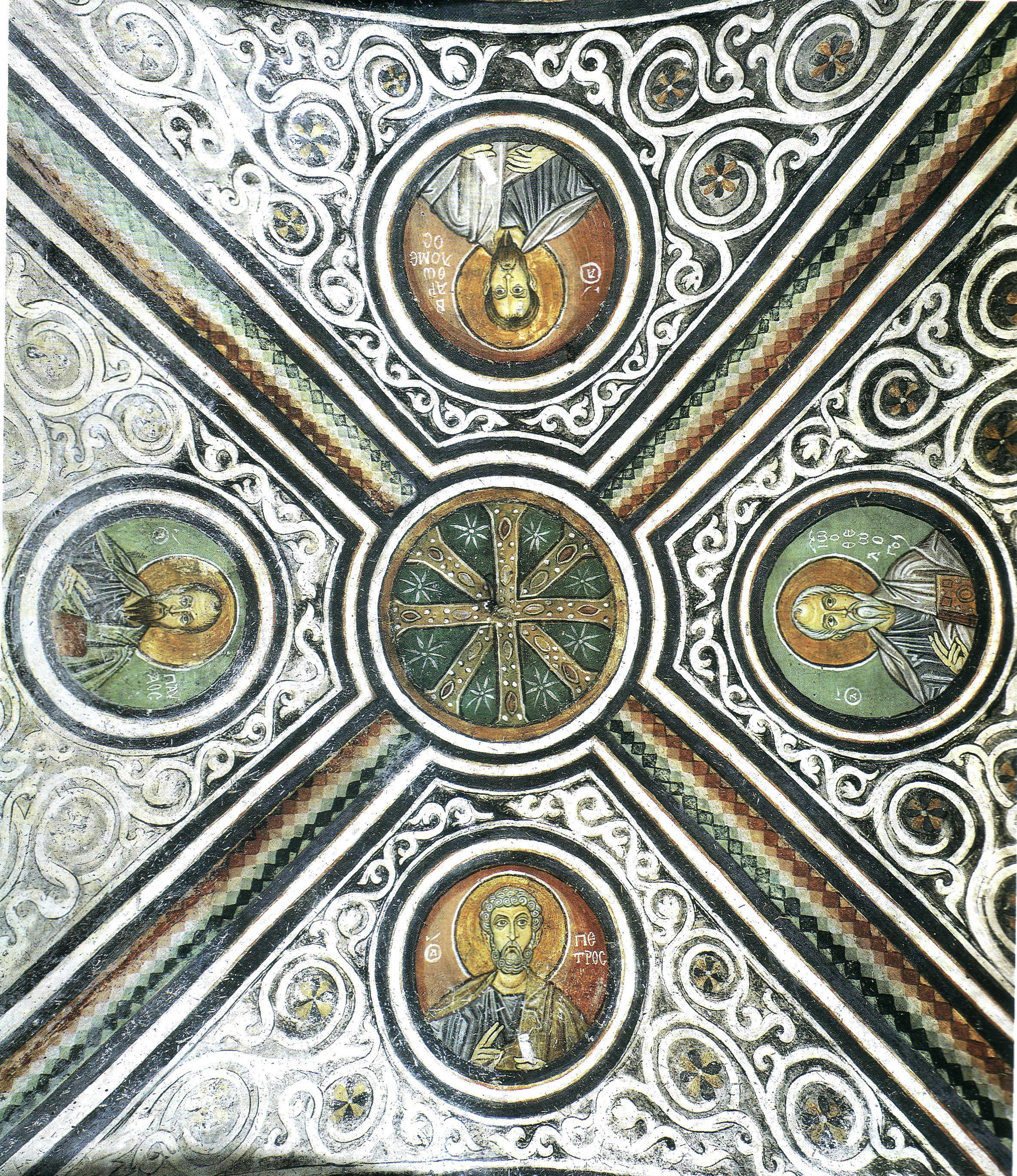
Clockwise:
St Bartholomew, St John the Theologian, St Peter, St Paul (crypt fresco)

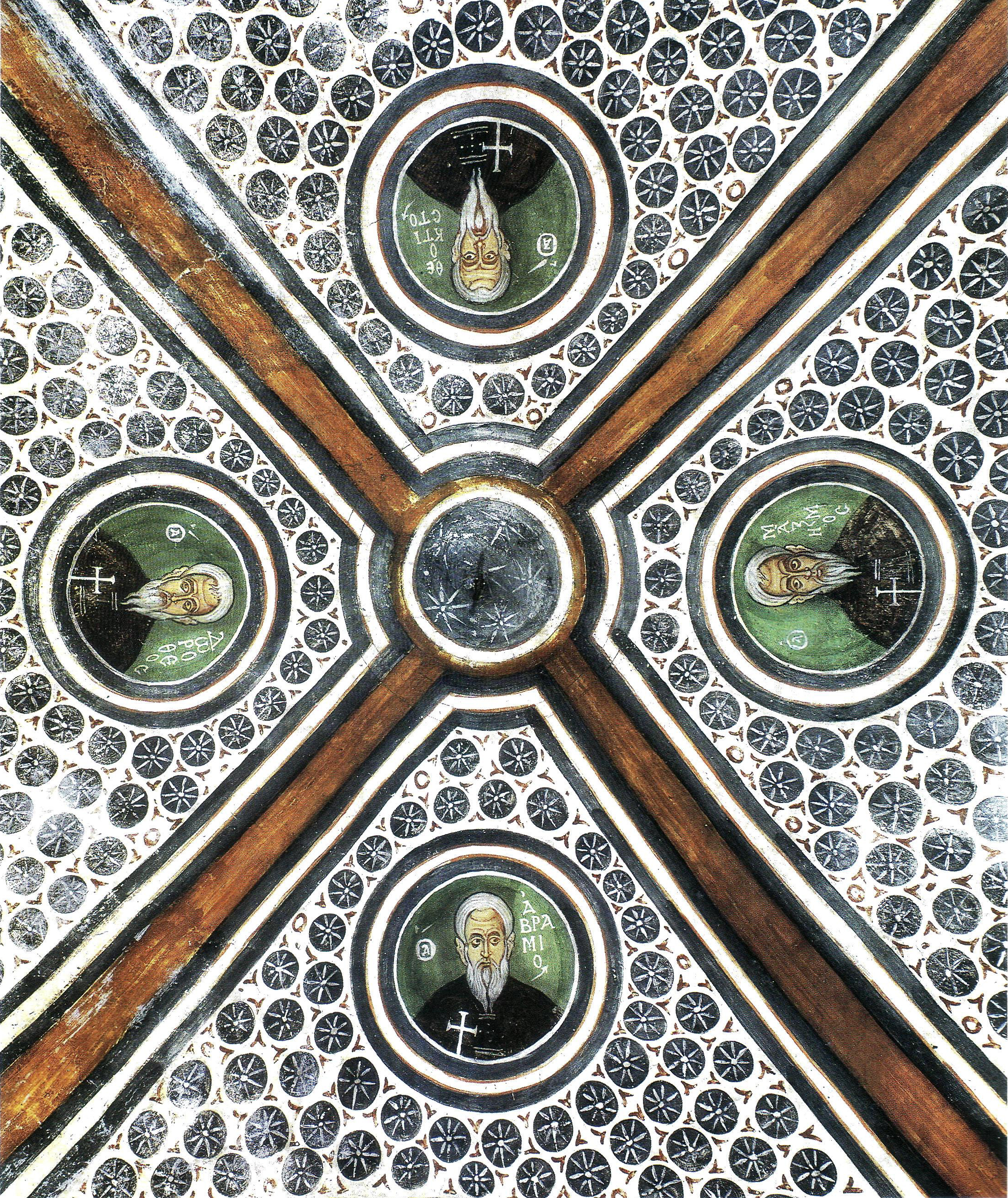
Clockwise:
St Theoctistus, St Maximus, St Abramius, St Dorotheus

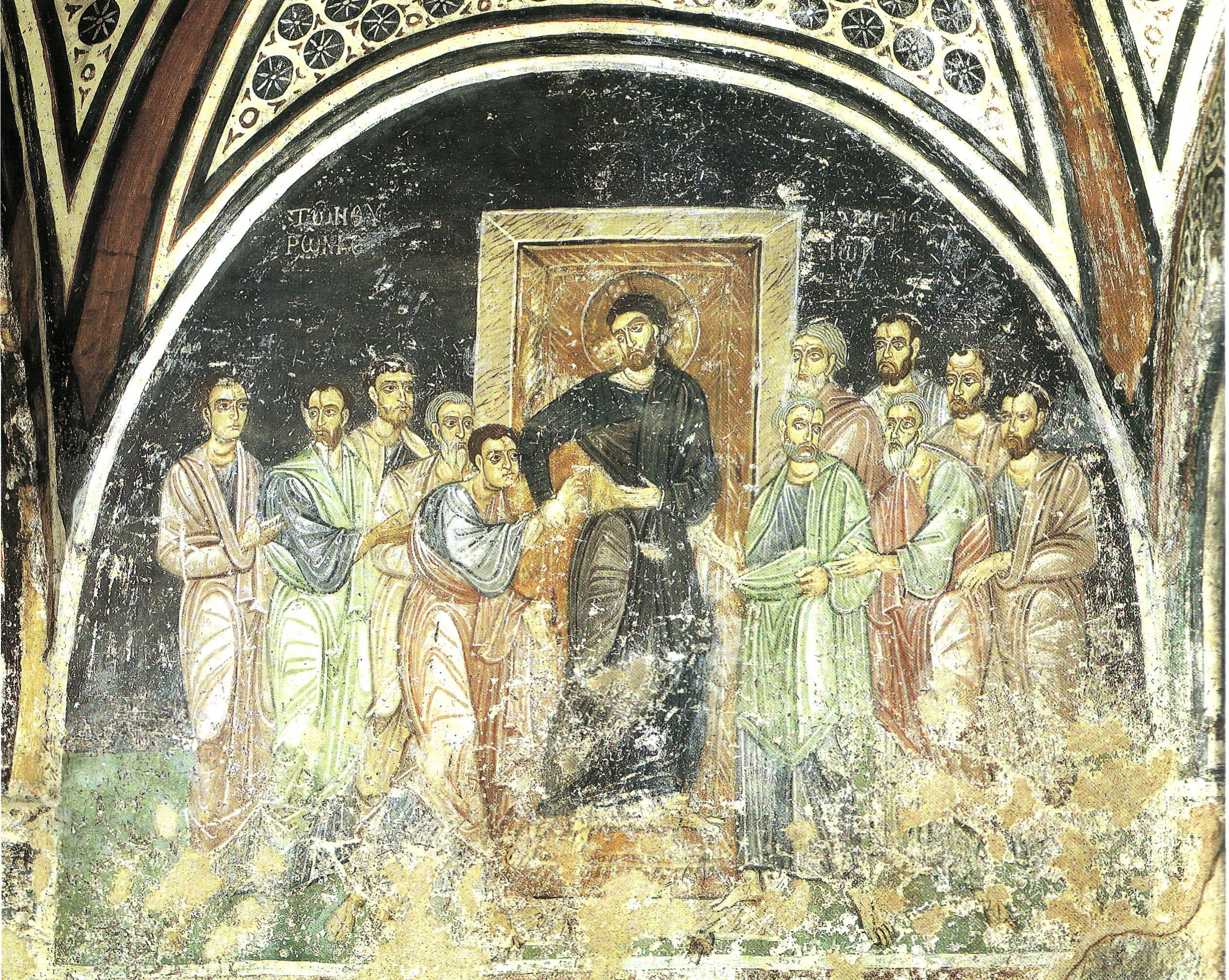
Touching of Thomas/Antipascha
(crypt fresco)

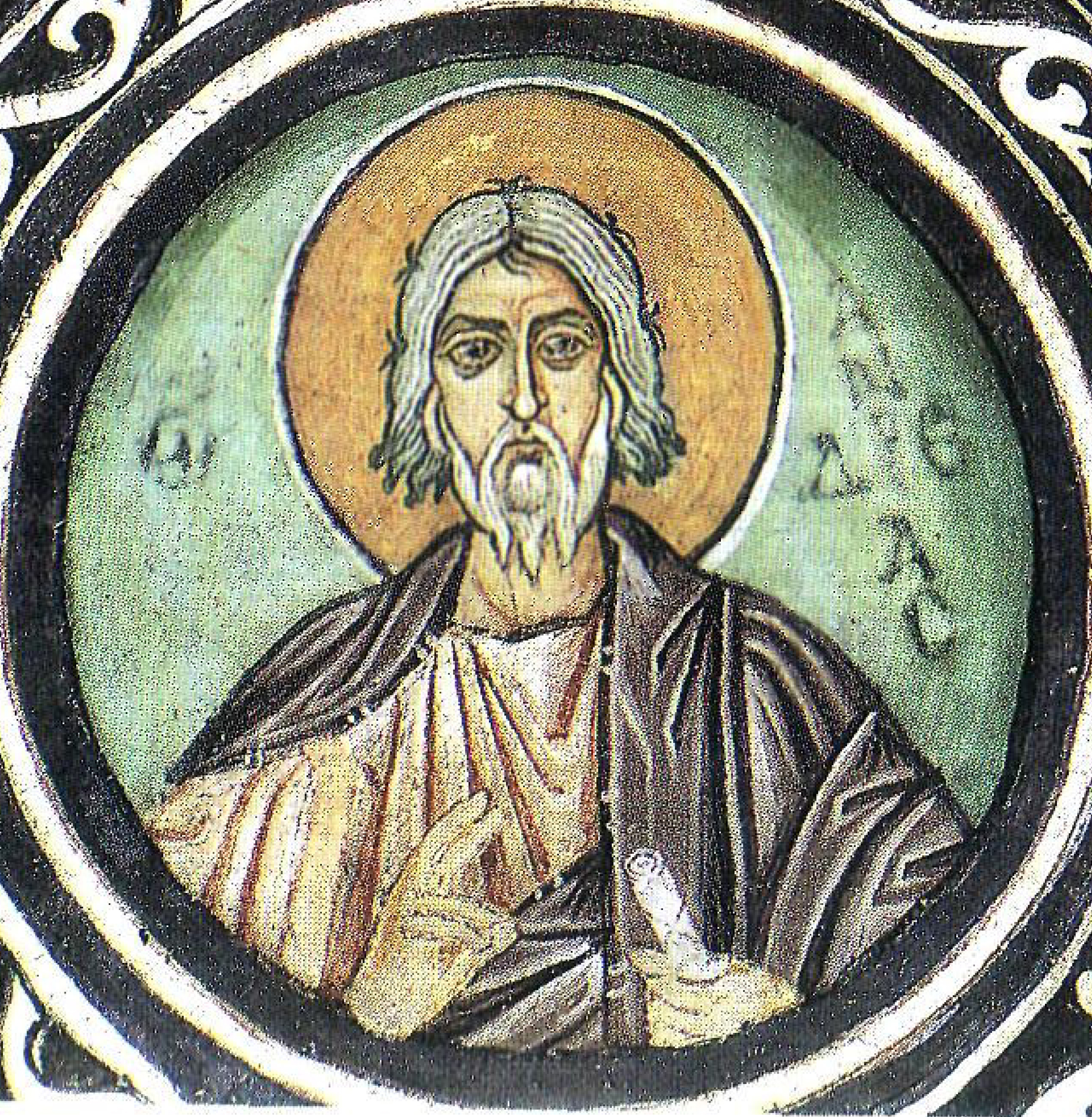
St Andrew

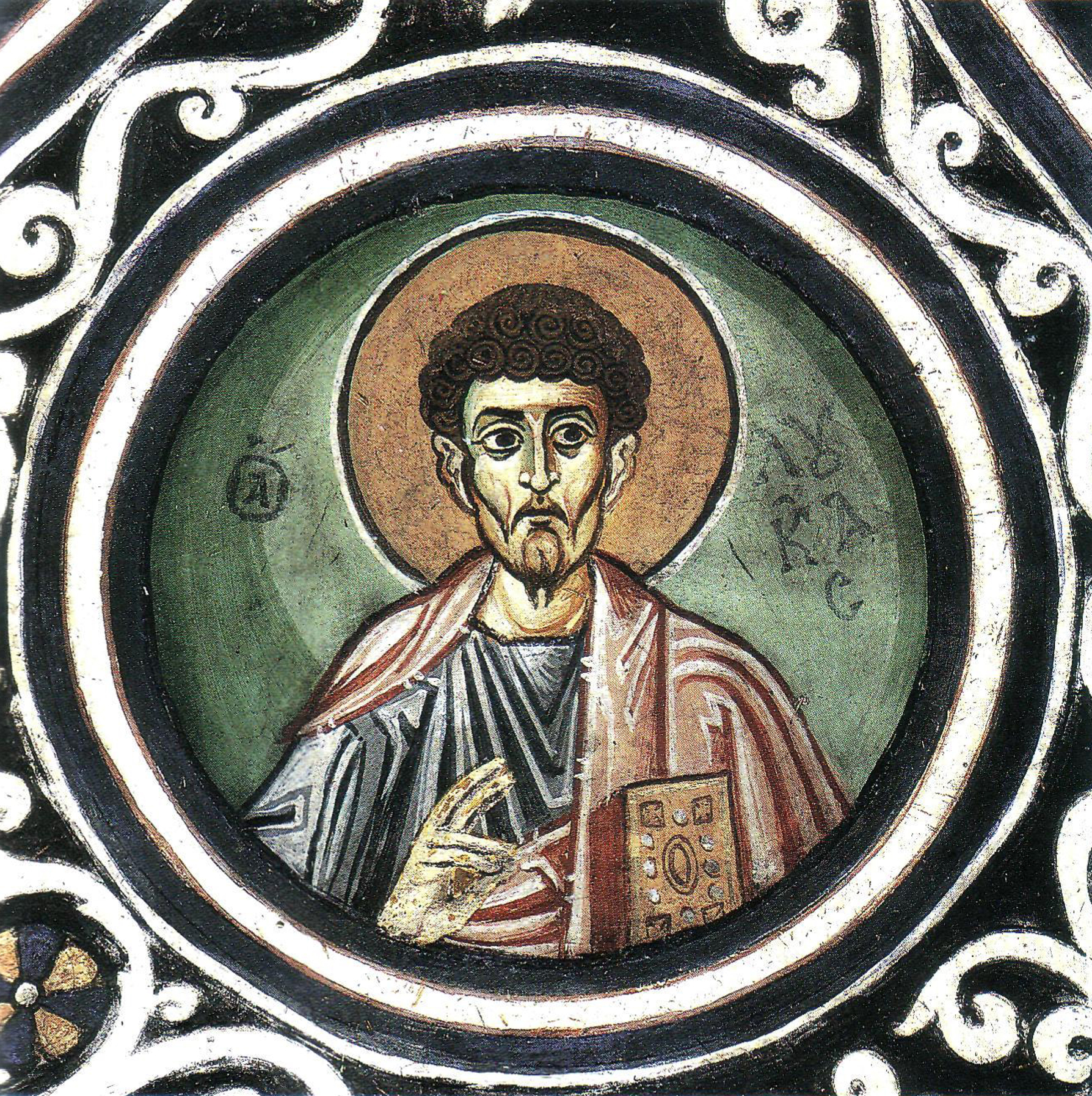
St Luke

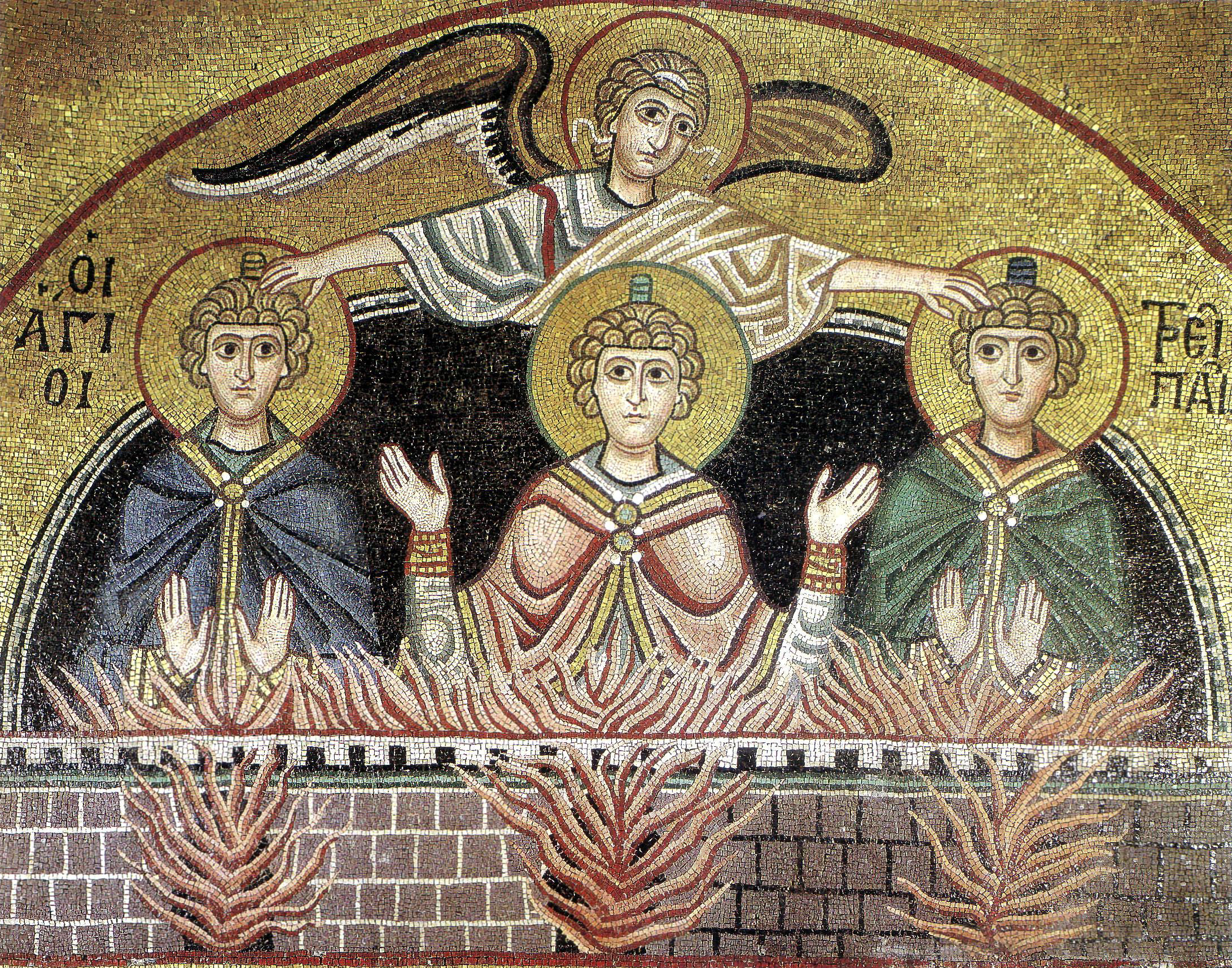
Three youths in the fiery furnace

== See also ==
- Macedonian art (Byzantine)
- Ancient Roman and Byzantine domes

== Sources ==
- Efthalia Rentetzi, Il Monastero di Hosios Lukas in Focide, in Ειρμός, n. 1, 2004, Αποστολική Διακονία, pp. 227–382, ISSN 1109-9135 (Weblink).
- Efthalia Rentetzi, Elements of Classical Style in the mosaic decoration of Hosios Lukas Monastery Phocis, Greece in ANISTORITON: Art History, Volume 9, June 2005, Section O052 (Weblink).
- Efthalia Rentetzi, Mosaici del monastero di Hosios Lukas in Focide e della basilica marciana: parentele stilistiche, in Arte - Documento, n. 16, 2002, pp. 66–71, ISSNT IT 1121–0524.
- Demus, Otto, Byzantine Mosaic Decoration: Aspects of Monumental Art in Byzantium, Boston, MA: Boston Book and Art Shop, 1955.
- Ousterhout, Robert, "Churches and Monasteries," in The Oxford Handbook of Byzantine Studies, edited by Robin Cormack, Elizabeth Jeffreys and John Haldon. New York: Oxford University Press, 2008.
- Cormack, Robin, "Wall Paintings and Mosaics," in The Oxford Handbook of Byzantine Studies, edited by Robin Cormack, Elizabeth Jeffreys and John Haldon. New York: Oxford University Press, 2008.
- Oikonomides, Nicholas. "The First Century of the Monastery of Hosios Loukas," in Dumbarton Oaks Papers, vol. 46 (1992).
