= Petro Verhun =

Ukrainian Greek Catholic priest (1890–1957)

Petro Verhun (In Ukrainian: Петро Вергун) was a Ukrainian Greek Catholic priest and martyr. He belonged to the Ukrainian Catholic Church, a Uniate Church that maintains the Byzantine Rite while being in unity with the Roman Catholic Church, and is venerated as a Blessed in the Roman Catholic Church. His feast is on 7 February.

Verhun was born on November 18, 1890, in Harodok, Lviv Region. He held a Ph.D. in philosophy, and on October 30, 1927, he was ordained at St. George's cathedral in Lviv by Metropolitan Andrei Sheptyski. After his ordination he was called to Berlin in 1927 as a pastor for the Ukrainian Catholics, where he first worked in the St. Josephsheim of the Carmelite Daughters of the Divine Heart of Jesus in Berlin. Later he would be moved to the Visator for Ukrainian Greek Catholics in all of Germany. Those who knew him in this position felt that he was a faithful leader who would be willing to sacrifice himself for his flock.

In June 1945, the Soviet security forces came to Verhun in Berlin and arrested him and then sent him to Siberia for eight years of hard labor. Even here, though, while undergoing unbearable living conditions, he was able to gather the faithful.

On February 7, 1957, he died a martyr for the faith in the exile village of Angarskoie, in Krasnoyarsk Krai.

== Testimony From Siberia ==
My life is very monotonous. I have enough to eat. I cook for myself. My greatest joy is that I can pray every day without disturbances Finally I don’t need anything. I feel that my head is tending little by little to my eternal rest. But I really would rather die in the monastery. – From the letters of Father Petro Verhun written in Siberian exile.
