= Luke of Steiris =

Byzantine saint

Saint Luke of Steiris
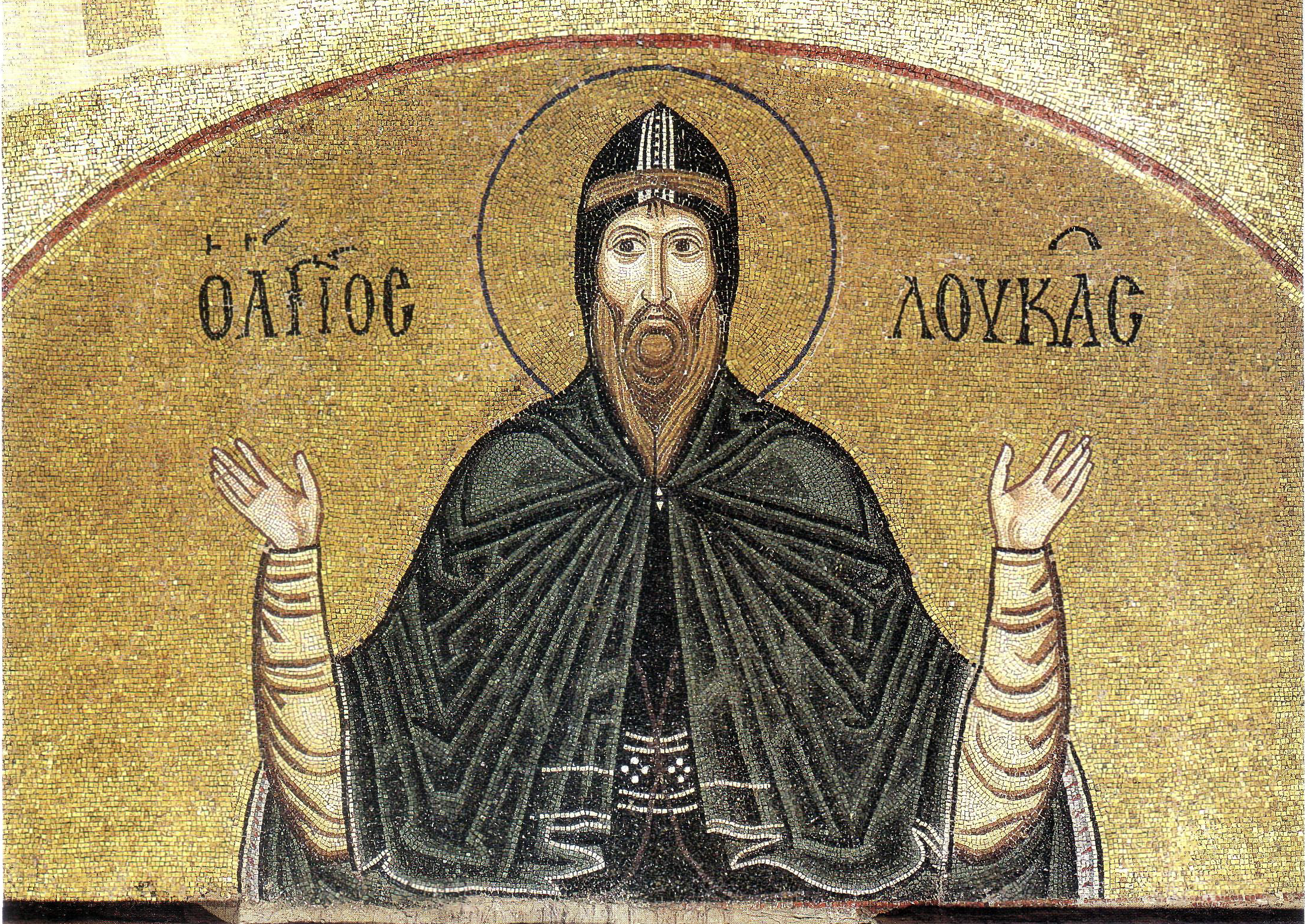
- St Luke the Younger (896-953 AD). Mosaic from the Monastery of Hosios Loukas.
- Born: c. 896; Phocis, Byzantine Empire
- Died: c. 953; Stiris, Byzantine Empire
- Honored in: Eastern Orthodox Church
- Feast: 7 February

Luke of Steiris, also known as Luke, Luke the Younger, Luke of Hellas, Luke the Wonder-worker (Greek: Λουκάς ό θαυματουργός; 896 — 953 AD) was a Byzantine saint of the tenth century AD who lived in the themes (provinces) of Hellas and Peloponnese in Greece, and who founded the Monastery of Hosios Loukas (Venerable Luke) on the slopes of Mount Helicon, between Delphi and Levadia, near the coast of the Gulf of Corinth in Boeotia, Greece. He was one of the earliest saints to be seen levitating in prayer.

The principal source for Luke's life is an anonymous Life written by a monk of Hosios Loukas who had been one of Luke's followers. His feast day is commemorated on February 7, and the translation of his relics on May 3. His relics are preserved in his monastery of Hosios Loukas.

== Life ==
=== Childhood ===
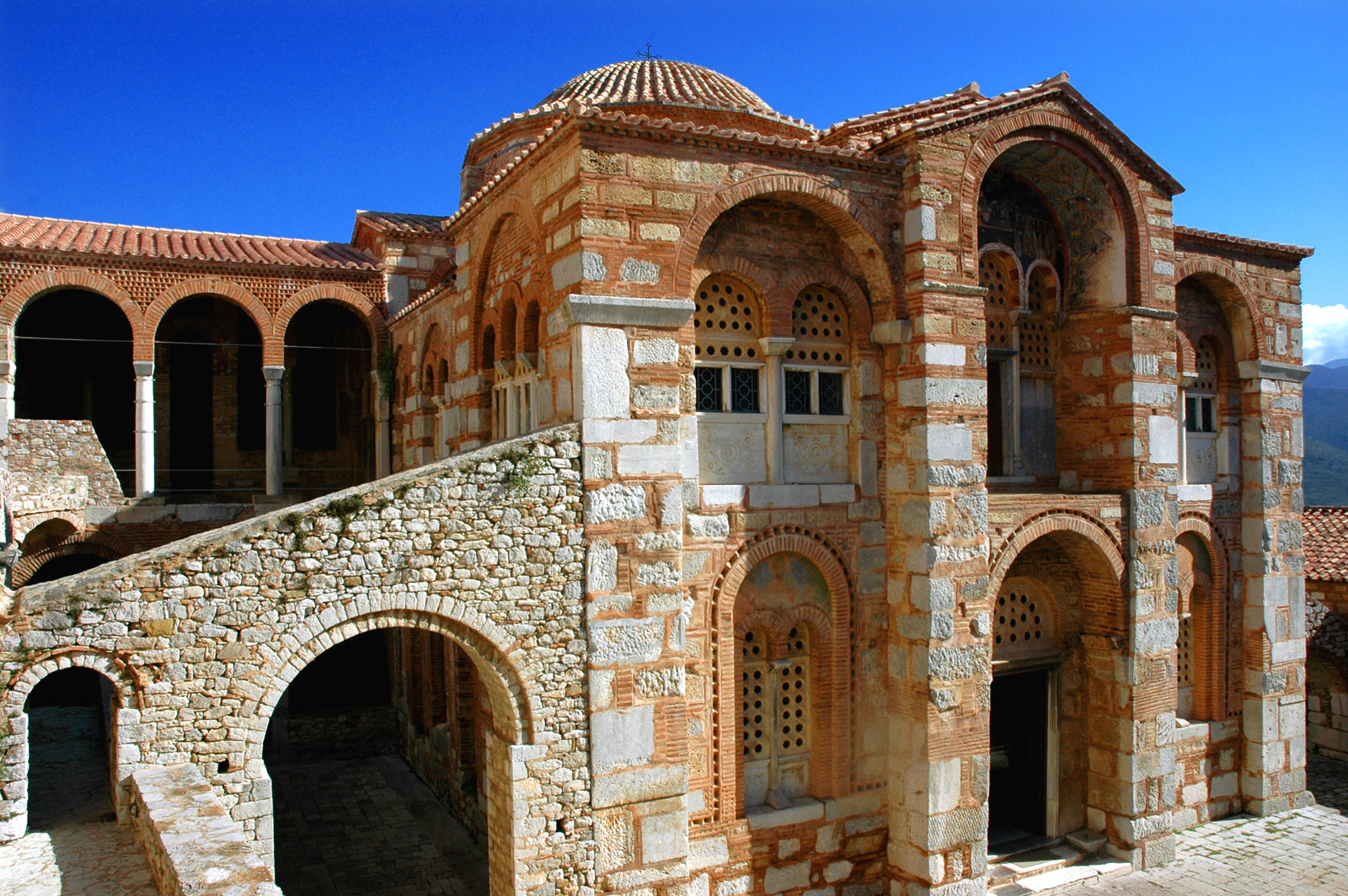
The monastery of Hosios Loukas

Luke was a native of the Greek village of Kastorion in Phocis. He was the third of the seven children of Stephen and Euphrosyne. The Life, typically for the genre, begins with signs of Luke's closeness to God as a child. For instance, Luke is recorded as having done 'nothing in a childish fashion', and is seen to be close to God when his mother witnesses him levitating in prayer.

The son of poor farmers, the saint worked in the fields and tended sheep. As a child Luke tried twice to leave home to seek a solitary life of prayer. The first time, he attempted to withdraw to Thessaly, but was captured by soldiers lying in wait for escaped slaves and was returned home. The second time he had more success, meeting two monks journeying from Rome to Jerusalem who took him to a monastery in Athens where he received the small habit. After Luke's mother prayed for her son's return however, God made her appear in a dream to the abbot and commanded him to return Luke to his home.

=== Asceticism ===
At the age of 14, with his mother's blessing, he went to a solitary place on a mountain called Ioannou (or Ioannitza) and for 7 years lived as an ascetic. The Life records with symmetry that during this time Luke received the great habit from two monks travelling from Jerusalem to Rome (presumably the same two from whom he had received the small habit on their outward journey). Luke's fame spread and a number of miracles are ascribed to him during this period, such as revealing to two brothers the location of their dead father's buried treasure. Numerous proofs of Luke's holiness are also given, such as sleeping in a trench to remind himself of death, or being visited in dream by an angel who let a hook down Luke's mouth and 'drew out a certain fleshly member therefrom', freeing him from the temptations of the flesh.

=== Exodus ===
Luke was forced to leave Ioannitza by an invasion of the Bulgarian emperor Symeon (which Luke had predicted). Luke, followed by the local villagers, fled to a nearby island, almost perishing when attacked by Bulgarians in a stolen ship. After the invaders withdrew, Luke, now aged 21, enrolled in a school in Corinth, but soon left after he found the other students insufficiently serious. Instead, he went to serve a stylite at Zemena for the next ten years, until he was stranded in the Peloponnese on an errand when the harbour master refused to allow him to return to Hellas, fearing raids (whether Bulgarian or Arabic is not mentioned). When Luke was ejected from his oratory in the Peloponnese after a rainstorm, his hagiographer comments that 'God perhaps arranged these things beneficially, lest dwelling too long in the land of Pelops he do an injustice to his fatherland', perhaps indicating a rival cult of the saint in the Peloponnese and providing an interesting example of patriotism towards the theme.

=== Return ===
The Life also cites Symeon's death in 927 and the succession of his more pacific son Peter as a reason why Luke returned to Ioannitza to build his own community. Luke drew so many followers that he found the distractions unbearable and decided to retreat further into the wilderness. Three years later, however, Luke was displaced again, this time by a Magyar invasion. Just as before, Luke retreated with the local villagers to a nearby island. Once there, Luke found the desert island to be a suitable place to pursue his solitary ascetic life, and stayed for three years, enduring terrible thirst.

Eventually Luke's companions persuaded him to leave, and he settled for the remainder of his life in the far more amenable environment of the present Hosios Loukas, where he founded his hermitage c. 946 AD in the area of Stiris (which may be a corruption of Soterion, or place of healing). (Note: Midway between Distomo (ancient Ambryssos) and the monastery of Osios Loukas, lies the village of Stiri, which is named after, but does not occupy, the site of ancient Stiris.)

Here brethren gathered to the elder, and a small monastery grew up, the church of which was dedicated to the Great Martyr Barbara. Dwelling in the monastery, the saint performed many miracles, healing sicknesses of soul and of body.

== See also ==
- Mystical levitation in Christianity
- Saints and levitation

== Sources ==
- Walter Robert Connor, Carolyn Loessel Connor (Eds.). The Life and Miracles of Saint Luke of Steiris: Text, Translation and Commentary. Volume 18 of Archbishop Iakovos Library of Ecclesiastical and Historical Sources. Hellenic College Press, 1994. 178 pp. ISBN 9780917653353
