= Franz Jantscher =

Austrian politician (born 1969)

Member of the National Council
- Incumbent
- Assumed office 24 October 2024
- Constituency: Styria

Personal details
- Born: 7 February 1969 (age 57) Leoben, Austria
- Party: Social Democratic Party

Franz Jantscher (born 7 February 1969) is an Austrian politician and member of the National Council. A member of the Social Democratic Party, he has represented Styria since October 2024.

Jantscher was born on 7 February 1969 in Leoben and grew up in Kammern im Liesingtal. He was an apprentice electrician and machine fitter at the Voestalpine steelworks in Donawitz from 1984 to 1988 and has worked there since then. He has been a member of the works council at Voestalpine in Donawitz since 2003. He also studied at the Chamber for Workers and Employees (AK) for Styria from 1993 to 1997. He has held various positions in the PRO-GE trade union since 2022, at regional, state and federal levels. He has been chairman of the Social Democratic Trade Unionists' Group (FSG) in Upper Styria East since March 2022. He was elected to the National Council at the 2024 legislative election.

Jantscher is married and has one daughter. He lives in Sankt Margarethen bei Knittelfeld.

Electoral history of Franz Jantscher
Election	Electoral district	Party	Votes	%	Result
2024 legislative	Styria	Social Democratic Party	357	0.26%	Elected
2024 legislative	Federal List	Social Democratic Party	68	0.01%	Not elected
