= Monte Sant'Angelo =

- Comune
- Comune di Monte Sant'Angelo
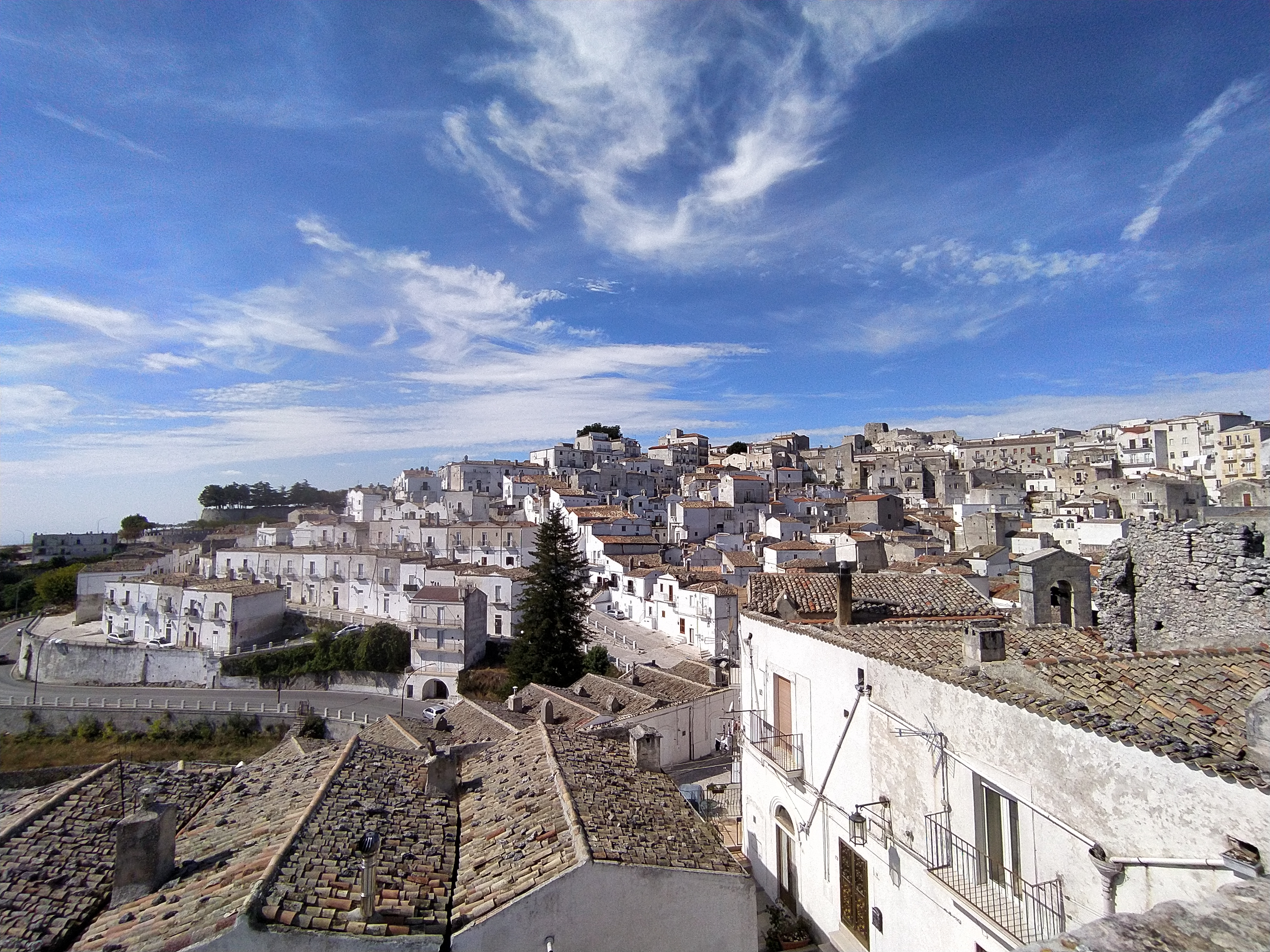
- View of Monte Sant'Angelo

- Location within Italy Location within Apulia
- Coordinates: 41°42′N 15°58′E
- Country: Italy
- Region: Apulia
- Province: Foggia (FG)
- Frazioni: Marina di Monte Sant’Angelo (Macchia), Ruggiano

Government
  - Mayor: Pierpaolo d'Arienzo

Area
  - Total: 242 km^{2} (93 sq mi)
- Elevation: 796 m (2,612 ft)

Population (31 March 2024)
  - Total: 11,160
  - Density: 46.1/km^{2} (119/sq mi)
- Demonym: Montanari
- Time zone: UTC+1 (CET)
  - Summer (DST): UTC+2 (CEST)
- Postal code: 71037
- Dialing code: 0884
- Patron saint: Saint Michael the Archangel
- Saint day: September 29
- Website: Official website

UNESCO World Heritage Site
- Official name: Santuario di San Michele Arcangelo
- Part of: Longobards in Italy: Places of the Power (568–774 A.D.)
- Criteria: Cultural: (ii)(iii)(vi)
- Reference: 1318-007
- Inscription: 2011 (35th Session)
- Area: 0.31 ha (0.77 acres)
- Buffer zone: 306.22 ha (756.7 acres)

Monte Sant'Angelo (Foggiano: Mónde) is a town and comune of Apulia, southern Italy, in the province of Foggia, on the southern slopes of Mount Gargano. It is one of I Borghi più belli d'Italia ("The most beautiful villages of Italy").

== History ==
Monte Sant'Angelo as a town appeared only in the 11th century. Between 1081 and 1103 Monte Sant'Angelo was the capital of a large Norman dominion under the control of Count Henry, who was a vassal of the Byzantine Empire. The grotto which houses the Sanctuary of Saint Michael the Archangel where, according to legend, the Archangel St. Michael appeared in 490, 492 and 493, has been the site of many famous pilgrimages (see: Saint Michael's line), which started from Mont-Saint-Michel, France. Pope John Paul II visited the sanctuary in 1987.

In the 17th century, the city became part of the Kingdom of Naples, to which it belonged until the unification of Italy in 1861.

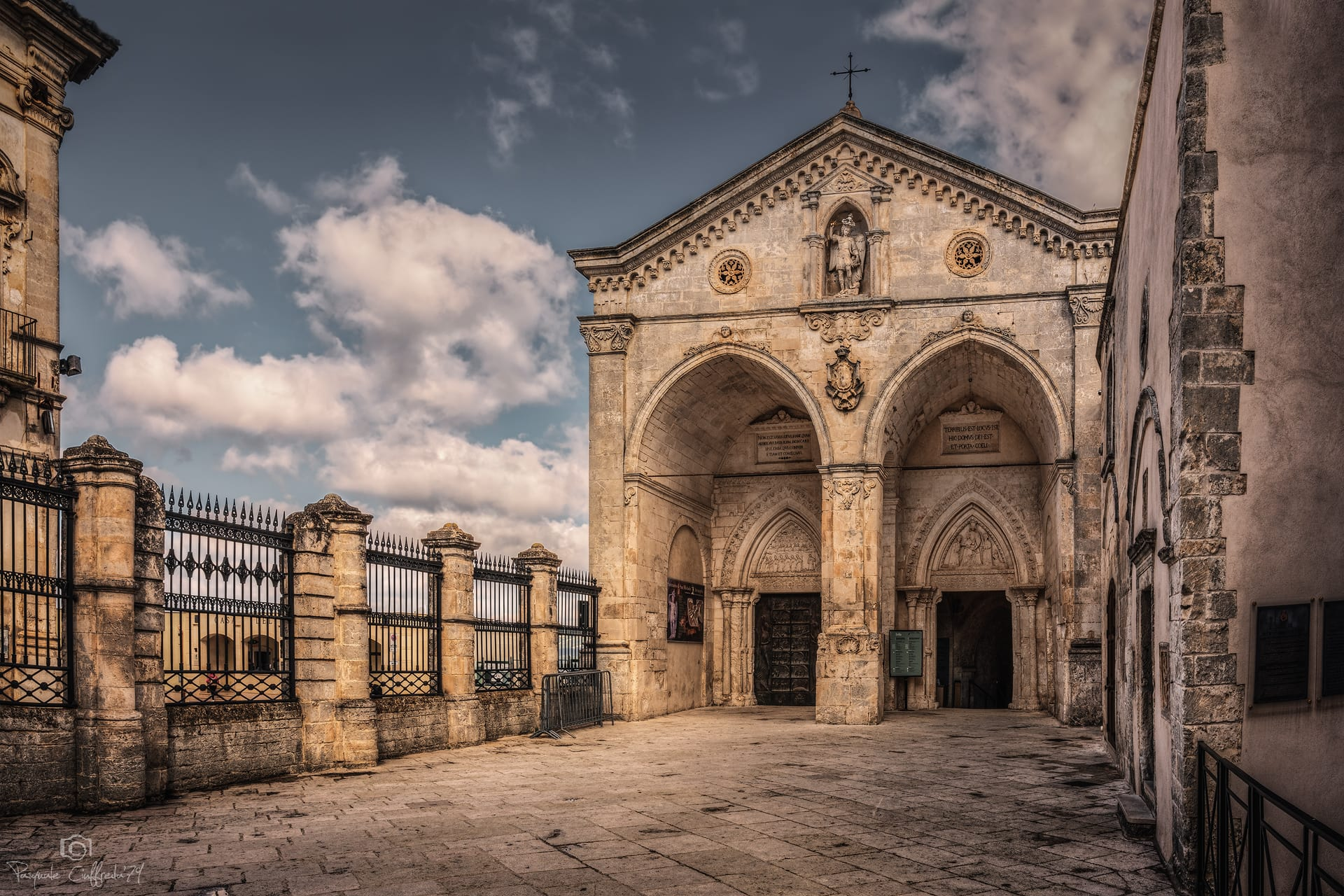
Sanctuary of Saint Michael the Archangel

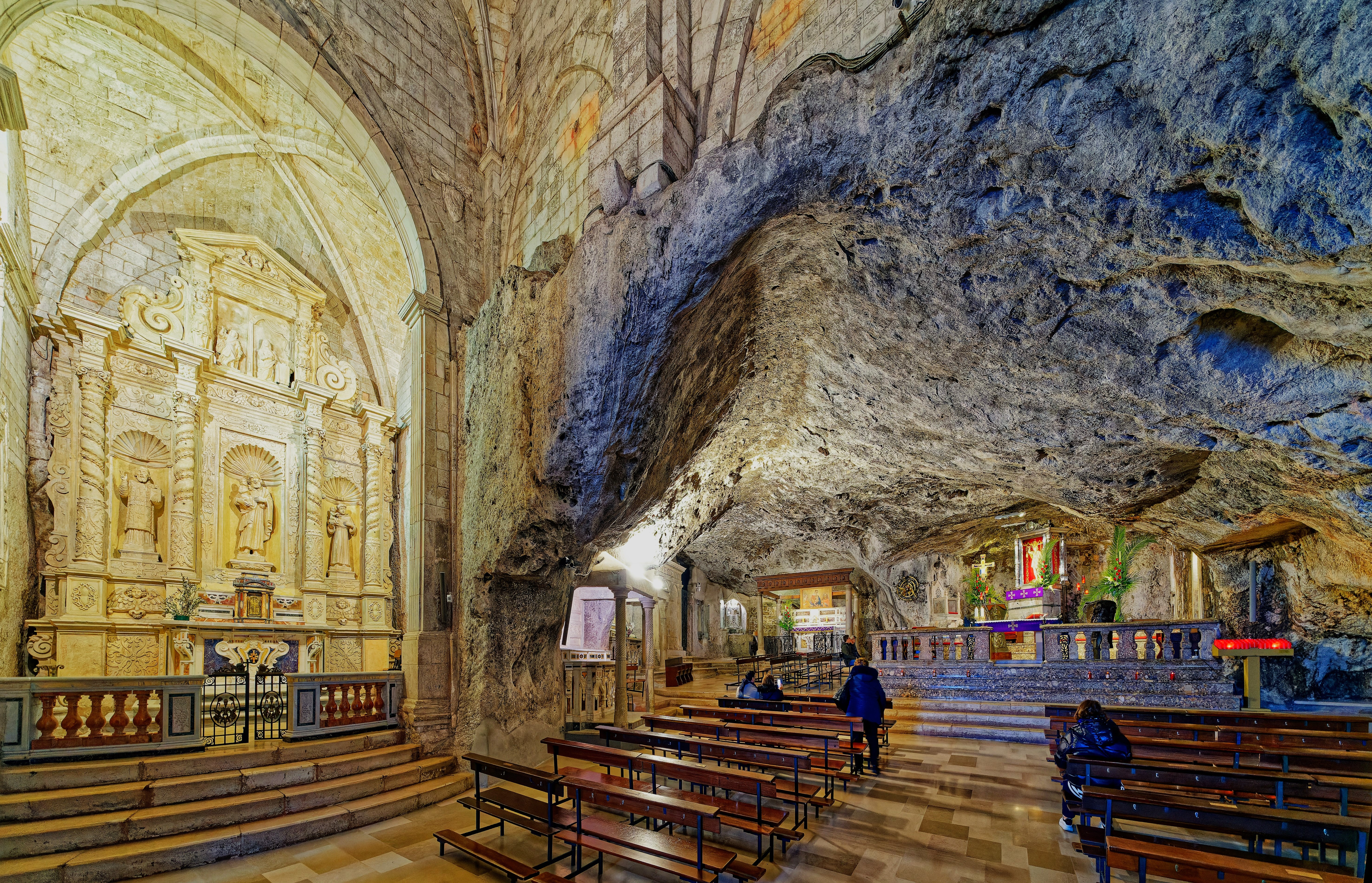
Interior (grotto) of the Sanctuary

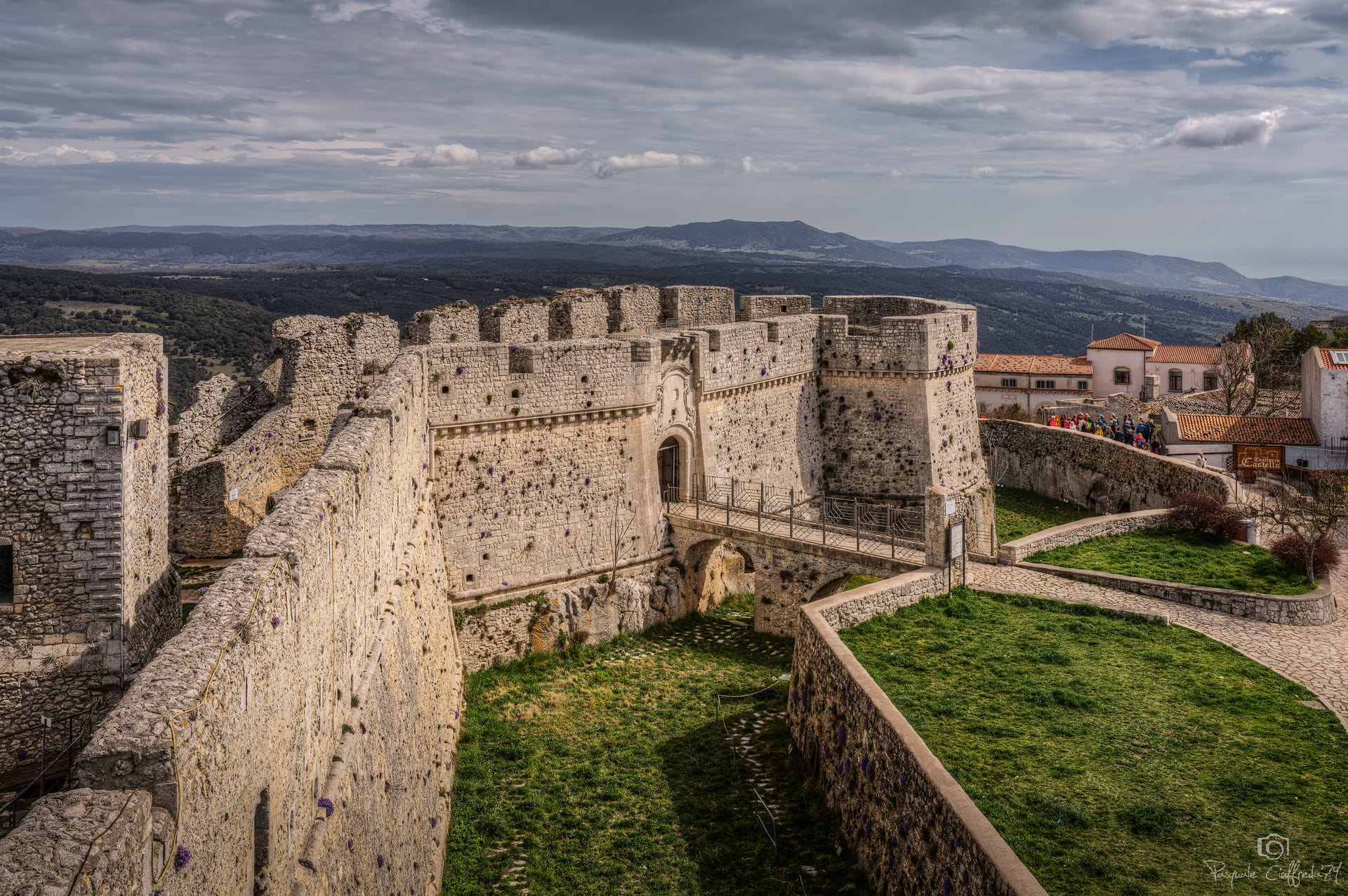
Monte Sant'Angelo Castle

== Main sights ==
The most important attraction of Monte Sant'Angelo is the Sanctuary of Saint Michael the Archangel, built in the 13th century by Charles I of Anjou. On June 25, 2011, the World Heritage Committee added the Sanctuary of San Michele Arcangelo in Monte Sant'Angelo to the UNESCO World Heritage List. The Sanctuary is one of the seven groups of historic buildings included in the World Heritage Site "Longobards in Italy. Places of the power (568-774 A.D.)".

Other sights in Monte Sant'Angelo include:

- The Castle, with bastions of different ages. The most ancient part, called Torre dei Giganti ("Giants' Tower") is a pentagonal tower 18 metres (59 ft) high, with walls 3.7 metres (12 ft) thick. Its first recorded historical mention dates to 979. Later it was the residence of Rainulf I of Aversa and the Robert Guiscard, who built the Norman Tower and the Treasure Hall. Emperor Frederick II restored the construction to use it as residence for his mistress Bianca Lancia, while under the Angevins it was used mainly as prison. Later, from 1464 to 1485, the fortress was the residence of the exiled Albanian condottiero Skanderbeg. The castle was largely rebuilt in the late 15th century by Ferdinand I. According to legend, the castle is home to the ghost of Bianca Lancia (popularly known as "Biancalancia"), whose sighs can be heard especially in the winter.
- The Tomb of Rothari (Baptistry of San Giovanni in Tumba), a baptistery dating from the 12th century accessible from the 18th century church of St. Peter. The portal has notable reliefs depicting biblical events.
- The church of Santa Maria Maggiore (11th and 12th centuries). The façade has blind arcades and a baldachin portal with sculpted frames. The interior has a nave and two aisles, divided by columns with sculpted capitals. The walls have Byzantine-style frescoes.
- Pulsano Abbey, at 8 kilometres (5 mi) from the city. It was built in 591 over a Pagan temple and was largely destroyed by an earthquake in 1646.

== Economy ==
Monte Sant'Angelo's economy is still largely based on agriculture and livestock breeding. A certain tourist importance is related to the presence of the Sanctuary of Saint Michael the Archangel.

== Employment ==
The majority of the working population own farmland, raise cattle, run bakeries, restaurants, or stores. Often stores and businesses are family owned.

The population of Monte Sant'Angelo remains relatively small due to lack of employment in town. Often, young people leave to find work elsewhere. Due to this the majority of the population is retired and elderly.

== Transportation ==
Monte Sant'Angelo can be reached by road through the Foggia-Monte Sant'Angelo SP.55 provincial road. The SP.89 provincial road passes through the frazione of Macchia.

== Climate ==
According to the Köppen climate classification, Monte Sant'Angelo experiences a mid-latitude humid subtropical climate (Cfa), bordering on a semi-arid climate with a mean annual temperature below 18°C (BSk); and a hot-summer Mediterranean climate (Csa).

Climate data for Monte Sant'Angelo (1991–2020)
Month	Jan	Feb	Mar	Apr	May	Jun	Jul	Aug	Sep	Oct	Nov	Dec	Year
Mean daily maximum °C (°F)	6.6 (43.9)	7.0 (44.6)	10.0 (50.0)	13.3 (55.9)	18.4 (65.1)	23.3 (73.9)	25.9 (78.6)	26.5 (79.7)	20.9 (69.6)	16.7 (62.1)	11.6 (52.9)	7.7 (45.9)	15.7 (60.3)
Daily mean °C (°F)	4.1 (39.4)	4.1 (39.4)	6.7 (44.1)	9.8 (49.6)	14.5 (58.1)	19.1 (66.4)	21.6 (70.9)	22.1 (71.8)	17.0 (62.6)	13.4 (56.1)	9.0 (48.2)	5.3 (41.5)	12.2 (54.0)
Mean daily minimum °C (°F)	2.1 (35.8)	1.9 (35.4)	4.2 (39.6)	6.9 (44.4)	11.3 (52.3)	15.6 (60.1)	18.0 (64.4)	18.6 (65.5)	14.3 (57.7)	10.9 (51.6)	6.9 (44.4)	3.4 (38.1)	9.5 (49.1)
Average precipitation mm (inches)	46.2 (1.82)	35.1 (1.38)	42.6 (1.68)	43.9 (1.73)	46.1 (1.81)	40.2 (1.58)	27.1 (1.07)	29.2 (1.15)	72.9 (2.87)	56.0 (2.20)	68.3 (2.69)	54.7 (2.15)	562.3 (22.14)
Average precipitation days (≥ 1 mm)	7.6	6.5	7.0	7.9	5.7	4.2	3.7	3.8	6.7	6.4	8.3	8.8	76.5
Average relative humidity (%)	76.7	73.2	69.2	65.8	64.2	59.8	56.4	57.3	69.0	72.3	77.9	77.8	68.3
Average dew point °C (°F)	0.4 (32.7)	−0.5 (31.1)	1.0 (33.8)	3.0 (37.4)	6.9 (44.4)	9.8 (49.6)	10.8 (51.4)	11.6 (52.9)	10.9 (51.6)	8.4 (47.1)	5.5 (41.9)	1.9 (35.4)	5.8 (42.4)
Source: NOAA

== International relations ==
Monte Sant'Angelo is twinned with:

- San Michele Salentino, Italy (since 2007)
- Vallecorsa, Italy (since 2009)
- Mont Saint-Michel, France (since 2010)
- San Giovanni Rotondo, Italy (since 2013)
- Bari, Italy (since 2013)
- Assisi, Italy (since 2013)
- Andria, Italy (since 2013)
- Alberobello, Italy (since 2013)

== See also ==
- Monte Sant'Angelo Castle
- Pulsano Abbey
