= Monte Sant'Angelo Castle =

- Castello di Monte Sant'Angelo
- Monte Sant'Angelo, Apulia, Italy
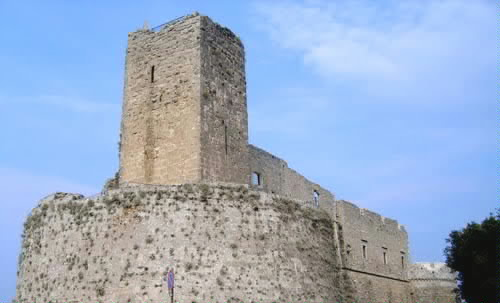
- Western ramparts of the castle

Site information
- Open to the public: yes

Location
- Coordinates: 41°42′0″N 15°58′0″E

Site history
- Built: 837
- Built by: Norman, then Fredrick II of the Holy Roman Empire

The Castle of Monte Sant'Angelo in an early 20th-century photograph

The Monte Sant'Angelo Castle is a castle in the Apulian city of Monte Sant'Angelo, Italy. Built around 837 by the Doge of Venice Orso I, it is currently used for exhibitions.

== History ==
Probably built in 837 by Orso I. the Castle has bastions of different ages. The most ancient part, called Torre dei Giganti ("Giants' Tower") is a pentagonal tower 18 m-high, with walls 3.7 m thick. The first news on its history dates back to 979; later, it was the residence of Rainulf I of Aversa and the Robert Guiscard, who built the Norman Tower and the Treasure Hall. Emperor Frederick II restored the construction to use it as residence for his mistress Bianca Lancia, while under the Angevines it was used mainly as prison. Later, from 1464 to 1485, the fortress was the residence of the exiled Albanian condottiero Skanderbeg. The castle was largely rebuilt in the late 15th century by Ferdinand I. According to a legend, the castle is currently home to the ghost of Bianca Lancia (popularly known as "Biancalancia"), whose sighs can be heard especially in the winter time.

== See also ==
- Monte Sant'Angelo
