= Bianca Lancia =

13th-century mistress of Holy Roman Emperor Frederick II

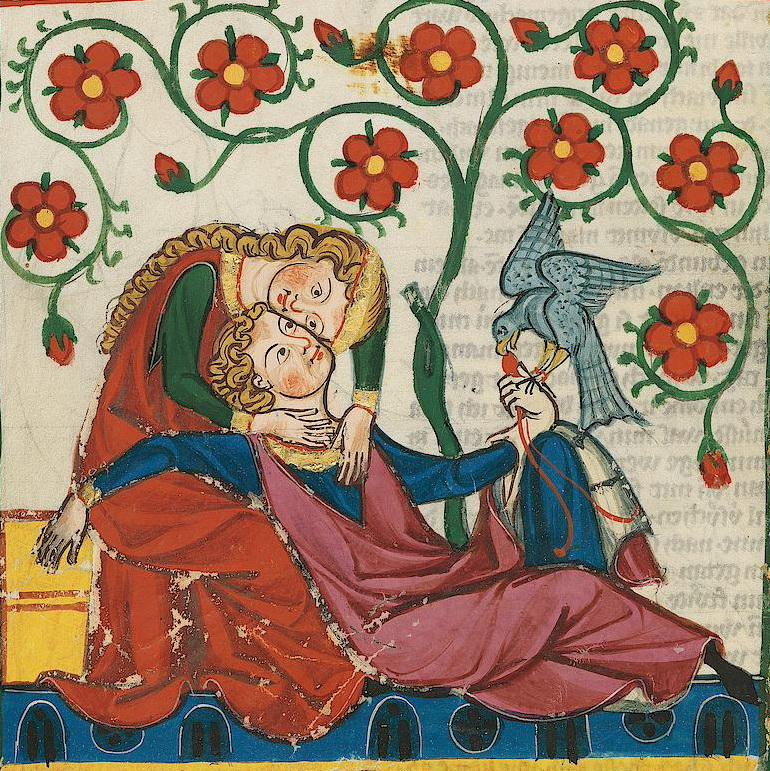
- Miniature from the Codex Manesse, sometimes identified as Bianca and Frederick
- Born: c. 1210; Agliano Terme, County of Savoy, Holy Roman Empire
- Died: c. 1248 (aged 37–38); Monte Sant'Angelo or Gioia del Colle, Kingdom of Sicily
- Spouse: Frederick II, Holy Roman Emperor
- Issue: Constance Anna of Hohenstaufen; Manfred, King of Sicily; Violante of Hohenstaufen
- Father: Bonifazio d'Agliano or Manfred I Lancia
- Mother: Bianca Lancia

Bianca Lancia d'Agliano (also called Beatrice, c. 1210 – c. 1248), was an Italian noblewoman. She was the mistress and later, possibly the last wife of the Hohenstaufen emperor Frederick II. The marriage was conducted while she was on her deathbed, therefore it was considered non-canonical.

== Origins and name ==
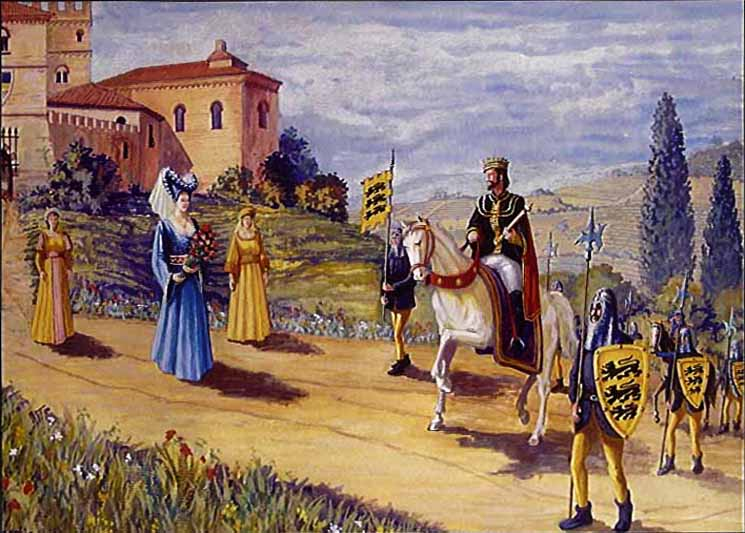
Painting of the meeting of Bianca and Frederick

The exact filiation and even the name of King Manfred's mother, traditionally called Bianca Lancia, are unknown. Historians have different versions about the identification of her parents, there was no clarity among contemporaries either:

- Salimbene di Adam mentioned Manfred's mother three times and could not unambiguously choose between "sister" and "niece" ("sister's daughter") of Manfred II Lancia. (Note: "Manfred was either from his sister, or from the daughter of the sister of the Marquis of Lanza, a Lombard from Piedmont"; "Marquis of Lancia, lombard from Piedmont; his sister or niece was the mother of Prince Manfred"; "Manfred [...] the son of Frederick from another wife, who was the niece of the Marquis of Lancia".)
- According to the Genoese annals of the time, Annales ianuenses, she was "the daughter of donna Bianca, daughter of the late Marquis of Lancia".
- Tommaso Tosco in 1279 wrote the Manfred was born "from the sister of the Marquis of Lancia, who was the daughter of donna Bianca".

Thus, the chroniclers mentioned her maternal origin from the Lancia family, and the name Bianca was called not by Manfred's mother, but by his maternal grandmother. The family received the surname Lancia because Manfred I (fl. 1160–1214), the alleged grandfather or father of Manfred's mother, has been lancifer (pikeman) of Emperor Frederick Barbarossa. The first indication of the name Bianca in relation to Manfred's mother goes back to Bartholomew of Neocastro, (Note: "The fifth [wife of Frederick II] Bianca was a noble lady from the noble lombard family of Lancia".) who wrote only 40 years after Manfred's death. Perhaps the name Bianca was borne by two women: the daughter of the Marquis Manfred I and his granddaughter, the daughter of the first Bianca. In the Lancia family, the repetition of names was a tradition. The same confusion among the chroniclers was caused by the name Manfred in three generations of men in the family. Tommaso Tosco also expressed the popular hypothesis that Emperor Frederick II could have had a relationship with both the elder Bianca and her two daughters, one being Manfred's mother.

Contemporary chroniclers do not mention Manfred's mother's father, which means that his origin is less noble than that of her mother. Even Manfred in 1247 is called "Manfred Lancia" in a document. Niccolò di Jamsilla, who lived at the court of Manfred, mentions that his maternal relatives were the Counts of Agliano, (Note: "ex parte matris sibi consanguineos attinentes [...] scilicet comitem Galvanum [Lancia], Bonifatium et Iordanum [di Agliano]".) and this may indicate Bianca's father, Bonifazio d'Agliano.

It is assumed that Manfred's mother was born around 1210. It may have happened in Agliano Terme (Piedmont), the family's estate.

== Life ==
Bianca lived most of her life at the Castello di Brolo, the ancestral seat of the Lancia family. It is not known when her relationship with Frederick II began and how long it lasted. It is widely believed that her meeting with the Emperor took place in 1225, when he married Isabella II of Jerusalem. According to Renato Bordone, it is unlikely that the Emperor met her in Agliano in 1225; in fact their meeting would have taken place between 1226 and 1230 in Sicily. In any case, the children of Bianca and Frederick II were born in the period after the death of Isabella II of Jerusalem in 1228, and before the Emperor's third marriage to Isabella of England, which took place in 1235.

=== Issue and possible marriage ===
Both the chronicles of Salimbene di Adam and Matthew Paris wrote that a "marriage ceremony at the moment of death" (Latin: confirmatio matrimonii in articulo mortis) took place between Bianca Lancia and Emperor Frederick II when she was dying. As Matthew Paris writes, Bianca wanted to marry for the salvation of her soul and the safety of her children's future, who were subsequently legitimated (Latin: legitimatio per matrimonium subsequens). With this, the Emperor probably also wanted to increase the number of his legitimate descendants and possible successors. The Church did not recognize this marriage as canonical. Matthew Paris also writes that the circumstances of the marriage were kept secret: there are neither witnesses nor any records.

There is only circumstantial evidence that this marriage took place. In 1250, in Frederick II's will, Manfred was recognized and mentioned as a legitimate son. At the same time, on 21 April 1247, when he married, was under the name of "Manfred Lancia". This means that Manfred was legitimized between 1247 and 1250.

Bianca and Frederick II had three children together:

- Constance (1230 – April 1307), who married the Emperor of Nicea, John Vatatzes in 1244, and thereupon her name changed to Anna.
- Manfred (1232 – 26 February 1266), who succeeded his father as ruler of Sicily (initially as regent, before usurping the throne for himself).
- Violante (1233 – 1264), who married Richard Sanseverino, Count of Caserta in 1246 and had a son, Corrad. She died during another childbirth. The Chronica regia Coloniensis (Note: "the Emperor learned about this from the Countess of Caserta, whose son was married to the Emperor's own daughter".) and Salimbene di Adam (Note: "Count of Caserta of Apulia, married, it seems to me, to Manfred's sister".) mention her, although they do not mention her name.

=== Death ===
Contemporary sources, such as the Annales ianuenses, dated Bianca's death between 1234 and 1246. For example, Matthew Paris reported that Bianca died 20 years after the first meeting with Frederick II. This gives approximately 1246. Elsewhere, the chronicler wrote that this was 20 years before 1256, indicating around 1236. However, since marriage to the Emperor was a necessary condition for legitimizing his children, it must be admitted that she died no earlier than 1247. At the same time, Bianca probably died before Frederick II, since the castle of Monte Sant'Angelo, located in the cities of Vieste and Siponto (which, according to King William II of Sicily's will, was the traditional possession of the Queens of Sicily as a "gift morning" after the wedding night and would remain in their possession as a dower), was granted by the Emperor to his son Manfred.

== Legend ==
According to a legend recorded by the monk Bonaventure da Lama and found by the historian Pantaleo, Frederick II was jealous of his mistress because he suspected she was having an affair with a page and locked her in the tower of the Castello Normanno-Svevo in Gioia del Colle or in that in Monte Sant'Angelo. She was pregnant with Violante at the time. Bianca could not endure this humiliation and, having given birth to the daughter, she cut off her breasts and sent them to the Emperor on a tray. The day after, she committed suicide by throwing herself from the tower into the moat below. Since that day, every night in the castle tower, now called the Tower of the Empress, a faint, heartbreaking cry is heard. In Monte Sant'Angelo, local legend holds that at the spot where Bianca died, white flowers sprout every year.

== Bibliography ==
- Salimbene di Adam (2004). Chronicle (in Russian). Translated by I. S. Kultysheva; S. S. Prokopovich; V. D. Savukova; M. A. Tariverdieva. Moscow: ROSSPEN.
  - Salimbene di Adam. "Chronicle, part XII". Восточная Литература (in Russian). pp. 373–408.
  - Salimbene di Adam. "Chronicle, part XIV". Восточная Литература (in Russian). pp. 433–478.
  - Salimbene di Adam. "Chronicle, part XVI". Восточная Литература (in Russian). pp. 511–549.
- Richard of San Germano. "Chronicle". Восточная Литература (in Russian).
- КЕЛЬНСКАЯ КОРОЛЕВСКАЯ ХРОНИКА: Chronica regia Coloniensis. Восточная Литература (in Russian).
- Matthew Paris (1872). Chronica majora. Vol. II. London: Longman & Co.
