= Pulsano Abbey =

Abbay of Monte Sant'Angelo, Italy

Coordinates: 41°40′32″N 15°54′29″E

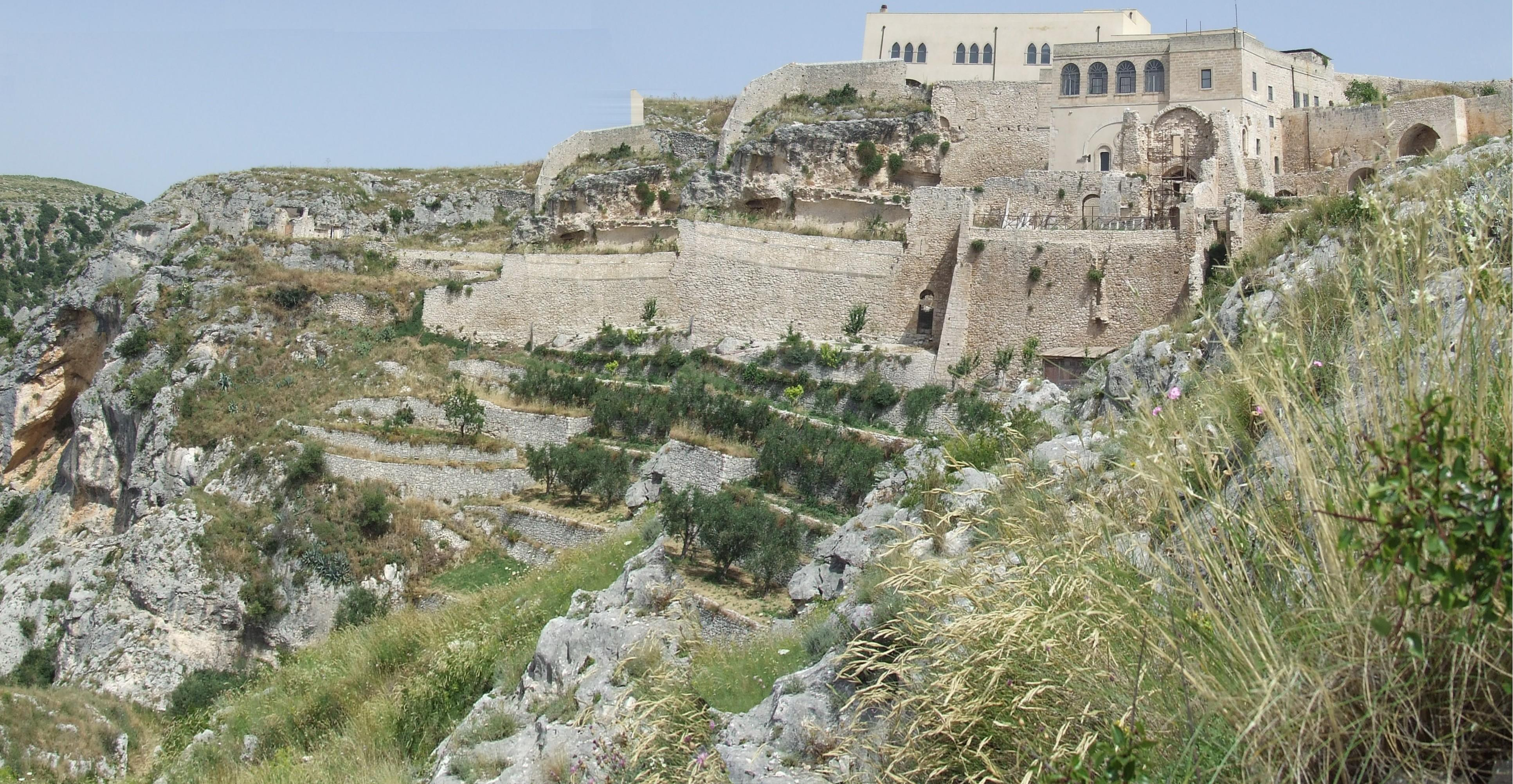
Pulsano Abbey, Monte Sant'Angelo

Pulsano Abbey (Italian: Abbazia di Santa Maria di Pulsano; Abbazia di Pulsano), is a Catholic sanctuary on Mount Gargano, Italy, part of the commune of Monte Sant'Angelo, in the province of Foggia.

== History ==
The historic site and its environs are protected by the Gargano National Park.

== See also ==
- Monte Sant'Angelo
